= List of mergers and acquisitions by Gen Digital =

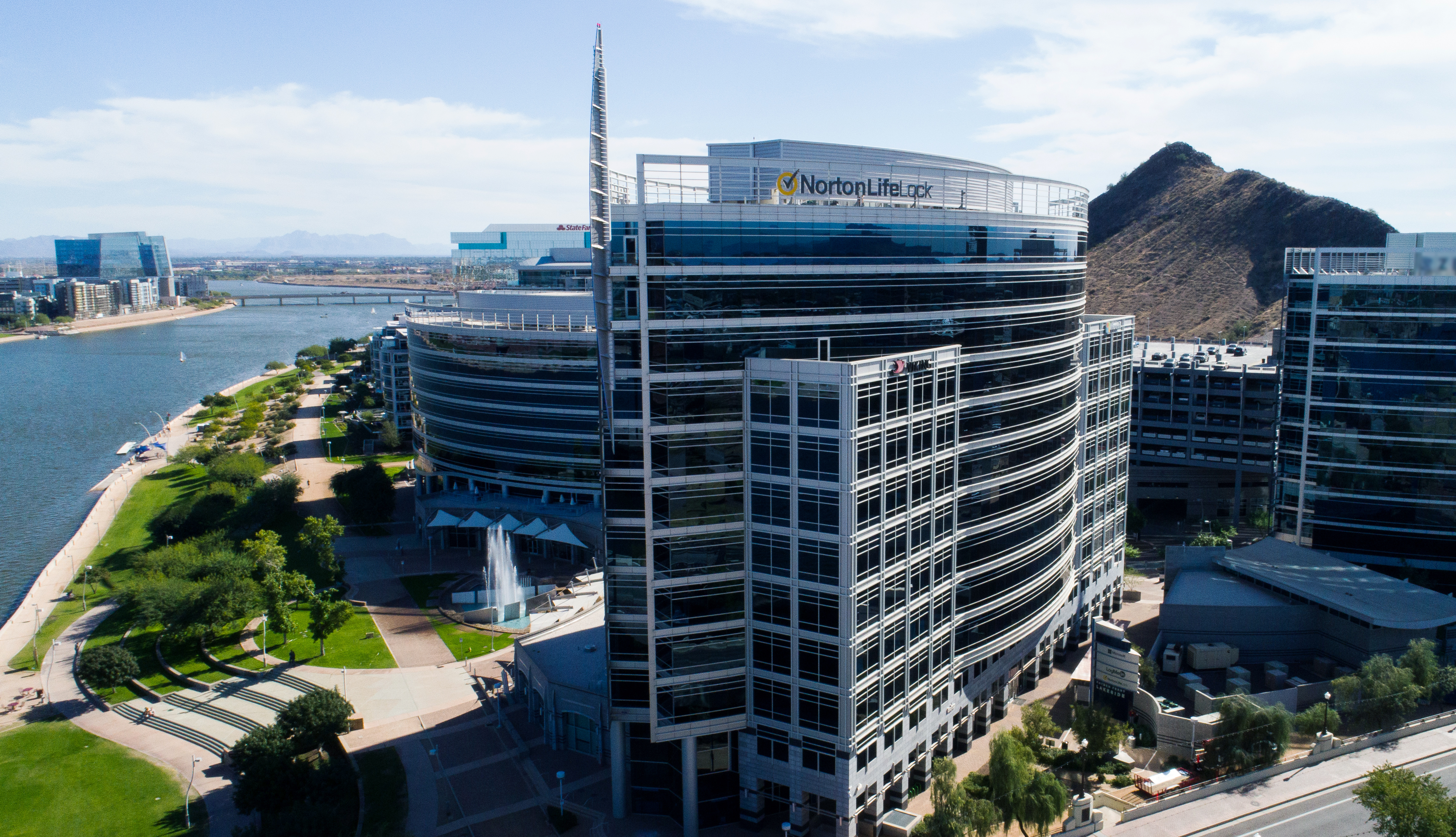
Gen Digital co-headquarters in Tempe, Arizona

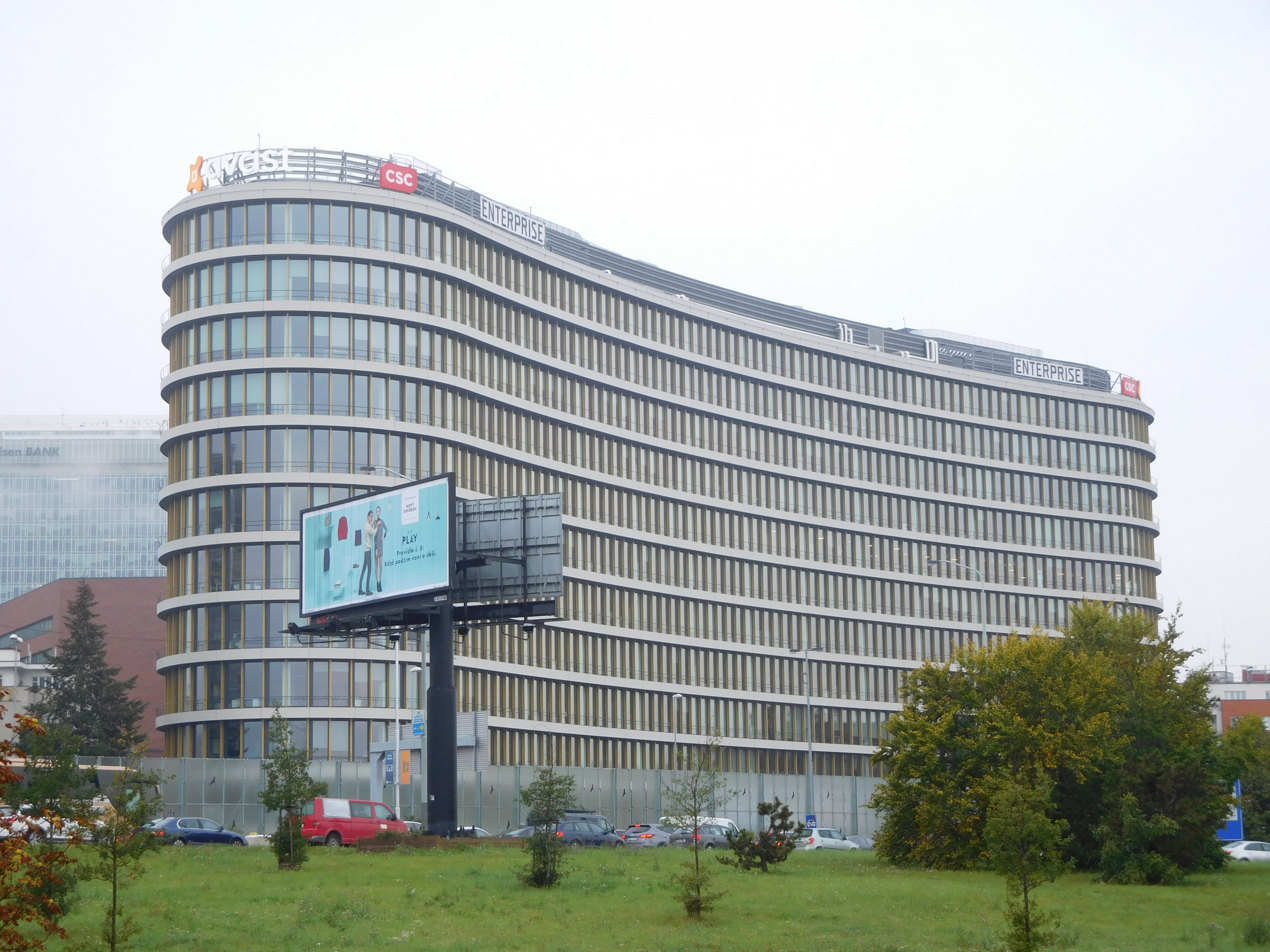
Gen Digital co-headquarters at the Enterprise Office Center building in Prague, Czech Republic

Gen Digital, formerly known as Symantec and NortonLifeLock, is a multinational computer software company founded on March 1, 1982. It is an international corporation that specializes in selling security and information management software. Gary Hendrix founded the company in 1982 with the help of a National Science Foundation grant. Symantec was originally focused on artificial intelligence-related projects, and Hendrix hired several Stanford University natural language processing researchers as the company's first employees. After the company's initial public offering in 1989, Hendrix left the company in 1991 and moved to Texas. The company has acquired 57 companies, purchased stakes in 2 firms, and divested 26 companies, in which parts of the company are sold to another company. Of the companies that Symantec has acquired, 50 were based in the United States. Symantec has not released the financial details for most of these mergers and acquisitions.

Symantec's first acquisition was C&E Software on January 1, 1984, and the founder of C&E Software, Gordon Eubanks, became the new chief executive officer of Symantec. The company has made five acquisitions with a value greater than $1 billion: LifeLock was acquired on Feb 9, 2017 for $2.3 billion, Blue Coat Systems was acquired on Aug 1, 2016 for $4.65 billion, VeriSign was acquired on May 19, 2010, for $1.250 billion, Altiris was acquired on April 6, 2007, for $1.038 billion, and Symantec purchased Veritas Software on July 2, 2005, for $13 billion. The deal with Veritas was Symantec's largest acquisition and made Symantec the fifth-largest software company in the world. Symantec made the most acquisitions in 2004 with six: ON Technology, Brightmail, TurnTide, @stake, LIRIC Associates, and Platform Logic. The company divested its enterprise-security software business to Broadcom for $10.7 billion in 2019 and adopted the NortonLifeLock name. On November 7, 2022, NortonLifeLock rebranded to Gen Digital after completed its merger with Avast in last September.

== Acquisitions ==
Date	Company	Business	Country	Value (USD)	Adjusted (USD)	References
January 1, 1984	C&E Software	Software	United States	—	—	
July 8, 1987	Living Videotext	Software	United States	—	—	
October 26, 1987	Think Technologies	Software	United States	—	—	
September 4, 1990	Peter Norton Computing	Computer software	United States	$70,000,000	$173,000,000	
August 13, 1991	Zortech International	Compiler software	United Kingdom	$12,100,000	$29,000,000	
August 21, 1991	Dynamic Microprocessor Associates	Computer software	United States	$22,000,000	$52,000,000	
December 31, 1991	Leonard Development Group	Computer programming	United States	—	—	
April 4, 1992	Symantec UK	Wholesale software	United Kingdom	$26,200,000	$60,000,000	
June 9, 1992	MultiScope	Debugging software	United States	$6,765,000	$16,000,000	
June 9, 1992	Whitewater Group	Programming tools	United States	$3,280,000	$8,000,000	
October 9, 1992	Certus International	Anti-virus software	United States	$3,260,000	$7,000,000	
June 2, 1993	Contact Software International	Management software	United States	$47,000,000	$105,000,000	
October 7, 1993	Fifth Generation Systems	Utilities software	United States	$43,250,000	$96,000,000	
November 8, 1993	NetDistributor (Note: NetDistributor was acquired from Trik.)	Software	United States	—	—	
November 8, 1993	Trik-Distributor Mgmt Utility (Note: Trik-Distributor Mgmt Utility was acquired from Trik.)	Management software	United States	—	—	
December 31, 1993	DataEase Intl Inc-Cert Tech (Note: DataEase Intl Inc-Cert Tech was acquired from DataEase International.)	Software	United States	$8,180,000	$18,000,000	
January 13, 1994	Quest Development	Data management software	United States	—	—	
June 1, 1994	Central Point Software	Utility software	United States	$62,960,000	$137,000,000	
June 1, 1994	SLR Systems	Software	United States	$2,300,000	$5,000,000	
September 30, 1994	Intec Systems	Mobile computing	United States	$1,610,000	$3,000,000	
July 28, 1995	Sytron	Computer peripheral	United States	—	—	
November 22, 1995	Delrina	Software	Canada	$378,080,000	$799,000,000	
June 30, 1996	Fast Track	Open network design	United States	$7,462,500	$15,000,000	
June 4, 1998	Eastman Software-Storage Mgmt (Note: Eastman Software-Storage Mgmt was acquired from eiStream.)	Storage migration technology	United States	$10,000,000	$20,000,000	
June 24, 1998	Binary Research	Disk cloning technology	New Zealand	$27,500,000	$54,000,000	
September 28, 1998	Intel Corp-Anti Virus Business (Note: Intel Corp-Anti Virus Business was acquired from Intel Corporation.)	Anti-virus software	United States	—	—	
March 30, 1999	Quarterdeck	Utilities and community software	United States	$78,411,000	$152,000,000	
July 21, 1999	Urlabs	Internet software	United States	—	—	
March 9, 2000	L-3 Commun Network Security (Note: L-3 Commun Network Security was acquired from L-3 Communications.)	Security solutions	United States	$20,000,000	$37,000,000	
December 18, 2000	AXENT Technologies	Security solutions	United States	$988,066,000	$1.847×10^{9}	
August 30, 2001	Lindner & Pelc Consult	Computer consulting	Germany	—	—	
July 2, 2002	Mountain Wave	Enterprise security management	United States	$20,000,000	$36,000,000	
August 6, 2002	SecurityFocus	Cyber intelligence	United States	$75,000,000	$134,000,000	
August 19, 2002	Recourse Technologies	Internet security	United States	$135,000,000	$242,000,000	
August 19, 2002	Riptech	Managed security	United States	$145,000,000	$260,000,000	
January 10, 2003	Virtual Access Networks	Client settings migration	United States	$2,000,000	$4,000,000	
April 17, 2003	Roxio-Goback Sys Recovery Ast (Note: Roxio-Goback Sys Recovery Ast was acquired from Napster.)	System recovery	United States	$13,000,000	$23,000,000	
July 18, 2003	Nexland	Internet access	United States	$19,600,000	$34,000,000	
October 20, 2003	SafeWeb Inc	Security and privacy	United States	$26,000,000	$46,000,000	
December 8, 2003	PowerQuest	Software	United States	$150,000,000	$263,000,000	
February 17, 2004	ON Technology	Network security software	United States	$101,110,000	$172,000,000	
June 22, 2004	Brightmail	Anti-spam software	United States	$370,000,000	$631,000,000	
July 13, 2004	TurnTide	Anti-spam software	United States	$28,000,000	$48,000,000	
October 8, 2004	@stake	Digital security	United States	$24,000,000	$41,000,000	
October 11, 2004	LIRIC Associates	Computer consulting	United Kingdom	—	—	
December 13, 2004	Platform Logic	Software	United States	—	—	
May 16, 2005	XtreamLok	Information security	Australia	$17,873,000	$29,000,000	
July 2, 2005	Veritas Software	Business applications software	United States	$13,520,000,000	$2.2288×10^{10}	
October 4, 2005	WholeSecurity	Security software	United States	$68,270,000	$113,000,000	
October 7, 2005	Sygate Technologies	Software	United States	$176,971,000	$292,000,000	
January 6, 2006	BindView	Network management software	United States	$220,716,000	$352,000,000	
February 13, 2006	IMlogic	IM protection software	United States	$90,700,000	$145,000,000	
February 17, 2006	Relicore	Management software	United States	$52,071,000	$83,000,000	
November 20, 2006	Revivio	Continuous data protection	United States	—	—	
December 1, 2006	Company-i	Information technology	United Kingdom	$37,000,000	$59,000,000	
February 23, 2007	4FrontSecurity	Risk management	United States	$7,000,000	$11,000,000	
April 6, 2007	Altiris	IT management software	United States	$1,038,238,000	$1.612×10^{9}	
November 30, 2007	Vontu	Data security software	United States	$350,000,000	$543,000,000	
January 11, 2008	Transparent Logic Technologies	Workflow optimization software	United States	$12,000,000	$18,000,000	
April 18, 2008	AppStream	Application Streaming	United States	$53,000,000	$79,000,000	
June 6, 2008	SwapDrive	Web-based software	United States	$124,000,000	$185,000,000	
August 8, 2008	nSuite Technologies	Desktop virtualization	United States	$20,000,000	$30,000,000	
October 6, 2008	PC Tools	Utility software	Australia	$262,000,000	$392,000,000	
November 14, 2008	MessageLabs	SaaS security	United Kingdom	$630,000,000	$942,000,000	
March 20, 2009	Mi5 Networks	Web security gateway	United States	$18,000,000	$27,000,000	
October 31, 2009	SoftScan	SaaS security	Denmark	—	—	
January 12, 2010	Gideon Technologies	Information security	United States	—	—	
June 4, 2010	PGP Corporation	Data encryption	United States	$300,000,000	$443,000,000	
June 3, 2010	GuardianEdge	Endpoint data protection	United States	$70,000,000	$103,000,000	
May 19, 2010	VeriSign security business	Authentication services	United States	$1,280,000,000	$1.890×10^{9}	
October 10, 2010	RuleSpace security business	Web content categorization	United States	—	—	
May 19, 2011	Clearwell Systems	eDiscovery	United States	$390,000,000	$558,000,000	
January 16, 2012	LiveOffice	SaaS archiving	United States	$115,000,000	$161,000,000	
March 2, 2012	Odyssey Software	Mobile device management	United States	$36,000,000	$50,000,000	
April 2, 2012	Nukona	Mobile application management	United States	$28,000,000	$39,000,000	
May 25, 2012	VeriSign Japan KK	IT security software	Japan	—	—	
July 18, 2013	PasswordBank	Identity management	Spain	—	—	
May 28, 2014	NitroDesk	Mobile data protection	United States	—	—	
August 14, 2015	Blackfin Security	Cyber security training	United States	—	—	
June 12, 2016	Blue Coat Systems	Cyber security	United States	$4,650,000,000	$6.238×10^{9}	
November 20, 2016	LifeLock	Identity theft protection	United States	$2,300,000,000	$3.085×10^{9}	
June 8, 2017	Watchful Software	IT security software	Portugal	—	—	
July 6, 2017	Fireglass	Malware prevention	Israel	$225,000,000	$296,000,000	
July 11, 2017	Skycure	Mobile threat defense	United States	$205,000,000	$269,000,000	
November 6, 2017	SurfEasy, Inc.	VPN provider	Canada	$38,500,000	$51,000,000	
November 5, 2018	Appthority	Mobile application security	United States	—	—	
November 5, 2018	Javelin Networks	Active Directory security	Israel	—	—	
February 12, 2019	Luminate	Secure application access	Israel	$200,000,000	$252,000,000	
December 7, 2020	Avira	Computer security software	Germany	$360,000,000	$448,000,000	
August 11, 2021	Avast	Computer security software	Czech Republic	$8,000,000,000	$9.505×10^{9}	
April 17, 2025	MoneyLion	AI-driven personal financial management	United States	$1,000,000,000	—	
March, 2026	Trellis	AI-powered insurance shopping	United States	—	—	

== Investments ==
Date	Company	Business	Country	Value (USD)	Adjusted (USD)	References
May 27, 2010	Mocana	Security	United States	N/A	N/A	

== Stakes ==
Date	Company	Business	Country	Value (USD)	Adjusted (USD)	References
July 24, 2000	Brightmail (Note: Symantec acquired an 11% stake in Brightmail.)	Anti-spam software	United States	$18,000,000	$34,000,000	
February 5, 2008	Huawei Tech Co Ltd-Telecom (Note: Huawei Tech Co Ltd-Telecom is owned by Huawei Technologies.)	Telecommunications	China	$150,000,000	$224,000,000	

== Divestitures ==
Date	Acquirer	Target company	Target business	Acquirer country	Value (USD)	Adjusted (USD)	References
March 28, 1989	NMB	Seagate Technology-Composite	Recording heads	United States	—	—	
November 30, 1989	Carolian Systems International	Delrina (Note: Carolian Systems International acquired a 51.5% interest in Delrina.)	Software	United States	—	—	
May 15, 1990	IBM	Delrina (Note: IBM acquired an 11% stake in Delrina.)	Software	United States	$1,900,000	$5,000,000	
August 13, 1991	Zortech	Symantec (Note: Zortech acquired 238,095 common shares of Symantec.)	Software	United Kingdom	—	—	
October 30, 1991	Read-Rite	Conner Peripherals-Film Ops	Computer disk film	United States	—	—	
November 11, 1991	— (Note: A minority stake of Delrina was acquired by an undisclosed acquiror.)	Delrina	Software	—	$4,000,000	$9,000,000	
February 15, 1993	RR Donnelley Norwest	Central Point Software	In-house manufacturing	United States	—	—	
May 27, 1993	Overland Data	Conner Peripherals Inc-Cipher	Cipher tape drive	United States	$9,000,000	$20,000,000	
October 18, 1993	DOVatron International	Conner Periph SG-Surf Asm Elec	Disk drives	United States	—	—	
March 31, 1995	CenterLine Software	Veritas Software Corp-Vista	Software tools	United States	—	—	
September 28, 1995	Quarterdeck Office Systems	StarNine	Internet services provider	United States	$12,470,000	$26,000,000	
November 27, 1995	Investor Group	Time Line Solutions	Computer-based management	United States	—	—	
March 11, 1996	Creative Wonders	Delrina	Computer software	United States	—	—	
September 10, 1996	JetForm	Delrina Corp-Electronic Forms	Database software	Canada	$100,000,000	$205,000,000	
November 14, 1997	Elron Electronic Industries	ON Technology-Network Mgmt	Network management software	United States	$13,500,000	$27,000,000	
November 30, 1997	Elron Software	ON Technology Corp-Network	Network security software	United States	$13,500,000	$27,000,000	
January 14, 1998	Platinum Equity	StarNine Technologies	Internet services provider	United States	—	—	
December 31, 1999	SalesLogix	Symantec Corp-ACT! Software	Information management	United States	$85,787,000	$166,000,000	
June 9, 2000	Seagate Technology	Seagate Software	Wholesale software	United States	—	—	
November 22, 2000	Investor Group	Seagate Technology-Disk-Drive	Disk drives and storage devices	United States	$2×10^{9}	$3.739×10^{9}	
November 30, 2000	Black Box Corporation	Intec Systems	Mobile computing	United States	—	—	
December 18, 2002	Sonic Solutions	Veritas-Desktop, Mobile Div	Software	United States	$9,200,000	$16,000,000	
May 10, 2004	TechTarget	myITforum	Web portal	United States	—	—	
January 31, 2006	Symantec (Note: Symantec repurchased the company's common stock outstanding in open market or privately negotiated transactions.)	Symantec	Internet software	United States	$1×10^{9}	$1.597×10^{9}	
March 10, 2008	Vector Capital	Symantec Corp-Application	Internet software	United States	—	—	
July 8, 2008	Electronic Evidence Discovery	Daticon	Litigation software	United States	—	—	
January 30, 2016	The Carlyle Group	Veritas Technologies	data management software	United States	—	—	
November 4, 2019	Broadcom	Symantec enterprise security	enterprise security	United States	$1.07×10^{10}	$1.3474×10^{10}	
