= Hilgraeve =

Software company

- Industry: software
- Founded: 1980
- Founder: John Hile; Matt Gray; Bob Everett
- Headquarters: Monroe, Michigan
- Products: HyperTerminal Private Edition; HyperACCESS

Hilgraeve is a software firm based in Monroe, Michigan, and is best known for its HyperTerminal Private Edition and HyperACCESS programs. In earlier years, HyperTerminal had been licensed for use by Microsoft in versions of Windows ranging from Windows 95 to Windows XP.

The company was founded in 1980 by John Hile, Matt Gray, and Bob Everett. The company's name was derived from the first three letters of each of the founder's last names.

The firm's first software product was HyperACCESS, which was initially designed to enable Heath 8-bit computers to communicate over a modem.

In 1985, this same product was ported to IBM PCs and compatible systems. Over the years the same version of this technology would be ported to other operating systems including OS/2, Windows 95, Windows XP, and Windows NT.

Competition heated up in the early 1990s and Hilgraeve would compete in the online communications software market against the likes of Datastorm's ProComm line of software, and Delrina's WinComm.

In 1994, IBM was the first major OS vendor to bundle one of Hilgraeve's products with a 32-bit OS by including a copy of the firm's terminal program with OS/2 Warp 3.0; it was named "HyperAccess Lite". One year later, Microsoft followed suit and licensed a low-end version known as HyperTerminal (essentially a "Lite" version) for use in their set of communications utilities. It was initially bundled with Windows 95, and subsequently all versions of Windows up to and including Windows XP.

Hilgraeve was an early entrant into devising anti-virus software, and received patents for its HyperGuard product, designed to prevent viruses from being downloaded while connected to an online service.

In February 2008, Hilgraeve's Healthcare business (HyperSend and HyperBridge) was acquired by Compuware.

== Patent Lawsuit ==
In 1997, Hilgraeve sued McAfee Associates and Symantec Corp. for alleged infringement of a software patent they were issued in 1994. The case was settled in 2003 and Symantec agreed to a $6.2 million settlement and, as part of the settlement, "Symantec said it would buy a Hilgraeve patent that covers scanning for viruses and other malicious code, as well as rights to other Hilgraeve patents."
