= WinComm =

Terminal emulator program

WinComm was a terminal emulator program for Windows that was offered by Delrina in the mid-1990s.

Seeing a growing business in online communications utilities, Delrina launched WinComm PRO. It was used primarily to connect to Bulletin Board Systems of the time, prior to the advent of the Internet. By double-clicking on an icon, the program would automatically connect to any of a number pre-defined online services, such as Delphi, Compuserve or GEnie, or to any other local BBS a user may have had defined.

Delrina tried to expand aggressively into this market space, first by acquiring the Canadian online bulletin board service CRS Online, and then using it as a distribution channel for free versions of its WinComm LITE and DOS-based FreeComm products in March 1995. The WinComm PRO product culminated in version 7.0, which was bundled with the CommSuite 95 software package, which also included versions of WinFax, Cyberjack, and TalkWorks.

WinComm was a relative latecomer to the market, which was dominated at the time by Datastorm's Procomm series of products.
