= Delrina =

Canadian software company founded in 1988

Delrina Corporation
- Type: Public (TSX: DC), (NASDAQ: DENAF)
- Industry: Computer software
- Founded: Toronto, Ontario 1988
- Founder: Dennis Bennie; Mark Skapinker; Bert Amato; Lou Ryan
- Defunct: November 22, 1995
- Fate: Acquired
- Successor: Symantec
- Headquarters: Toronto, Ontario, Canada
- Area served: Worldwide
- Key people: Dennis Bennie chairman and CEO; Mark Skapinker President; Bert Amato Executive Vice President & Chief Technical Officer, Lou Ryan Executive Vice President of Worldwide Sales
- Products: WinFax, PerForm, FormFlow, Echo Lake, Cyberjack, WinComm, TalkWorks, CommSuite 95
- Revenue: $132.9 million CAD (sales) (1995)
- Number of employees: 700 (1995)
- Website: www.delrina.com at the Wayback Machine (archive index)

Delrina Corporation was a Canadian software company active from 1988 to 1995. The company was best known for WinFax, a software package which enabled computers equipped with fax modems to transmit copies of documents to standalone fax machines or other similarly equipped computers. It also sold PerForm and FormFlow, electronic form software. Delrina was acquired by the American software firm Symantec in 1995.

Delrina also produced a set of screensavers, including one that resulted in a well-publicized lawsuit for copyright and trademark infringement (Berkeley Systems Inc. v. Delrina). The case set a precedent in American law whereby satiric commercial software products are not subject to the same First Amendment exemptions as parodic cartoons or literature.

It also sold online communications software with its WinComm product and produced a Web browser called Cyberjack. The firm was sold to Symantec in 1995. After the company was acquired by Symantec, various divisions were sold off and several of Delrina's former executives went on to found venture capital firms.

== Corporate history ==
Delrina was founded in Toronto in 1988 by Zimbabwean expatriate Bert Amato, South African expatriates Mark Skapinker and Dennis Bennie and American Lou Ryan. Delrina was Bennie's third major entrepreneurial start up after co-founding Mission Electronics, a high-end home entertainment equipment producer, and Aviva Software, which became Ingram Micro Canada. Delrina's business strategy was to "establish technical and market leadership in niche markets", which it accomplished with its electronic form and PC-based fax software. A year before the firm was incorporated, Amato and Skapinker had quit their jobs to start work on an electronic forms product which would eventually become PerForm. Both would later meet with Bennie, who was then the co-founder and CEO of Ingram Micro Canada before becoming CEO of Carolian Systems International, a firm that made business software for Hewlett-Packard. Bennie facilitated an initial seed investment of $1.5 million CAD to finance a new start-up company, "Delrina", to develop this idea. In return, Carolian received 51% of Delrina's shares, Dennis Bennie would become chairman and CEO, Mark Skapinker President, and Bert Amato CTO of newly formed Delrina Technology Inc.

Delrina's initial corporate headquarters was located in a small office on Mount Pleasant Rd. in Toronto. A sales office was set up in San Jose, California which became its worldwide sales center run by co-founder Lou Ryan. From its Toronto headquarters, the company expanded by establishing branch offices in Kirkland, Washington; Washington, DC; and Lexington, Massachusetts. Other offices were later established in the United Kingdom, France, and Germany.

=== Origins of PerForm ===
Delrina's initial product offering was an electronic forms application called PerForm. Amato and Skapinker came up with the idea for the product while working as consultants that what their clients wanted was a way to fill in forms electronically, rather than an easier way to create paper-based forms from a computer. There was significant and long-term uptake of electronic forms products within governmental agencies both in Canada and the United States, the latter spurred on in particular by the requirements of the Paperwork Reduction Act to reduce the total amount of paperwork handled by the United States government. One of the firm's early major software deals included a multi-year agreement to sell PerForm to the U.S. Navy in 1990. Soon after the software was installed on Compaq laptops that accompanied U.S. troops during the First Gulf War, where it was used to requisition "everything from Coca-Cola to privies". Other significant volume sales went to 3M and Rockwell International. What helped set apart Delrina's electronic forms from its competitors in product reviews included its easy-to-use interface, its extensive development tools, and its comparatively low price. It also scored highly when it came to workflow and routing functions as well as security features. In early 1991 InfoWorld selected PerForm Pro as its "Product of the Year" in the electronic forms category, and PC World Magazine gave the product its "Best Buy" designation. PerForm proved to be successful in its niche, effectively capturing the retail market by 1993.

In the early 1990s Delrina made deals with value-added resellers like NCR and GE Information Services who had the staff to customize the product to the needs of corporate customers looking to move away from paper-based forms. The forms products sold well and the annual revenues for the firm grew steadily; 1989 annual revenues (in Canadian dollars) were $5,630,393, in 1990 they were $8,759,623, and by 1991 they were $11,894,474.

=== Struggle for profitability ===
Despite the growing revenues, the company struggled to make a profit. Heavy expenditures—primarily marketing along with research and development costs—drove the firm's losses from $500,000 from 1989 to $1.5 million by the end of the following fiscal year. For fiscal 1991 it posted a net loss of $1.7 million.

Needing an infusion of funds, in April 1991 Bennie managed to raise $7.7 million in a private placement.

The firm subsequently sought to find ways to more widely distribute its electronic form software, with Bennie saying in May 1992 that "we've barely scratched the surface of our market".

In early 1992 word leaked to the press on a possible merger between WordStar International Inc., and soon after both firms made public the fact that they had signed a letter of intent on a merger deal. However, just over a month later word came out that the merger talks had fallen through, at the time cited to differences over "complex legal, accounting and management issues". WordStar, whose share of the word processing market had by that time fallen to 5% (from a high of 80%) was seeking Delrina's advanced technologies while Delrina was hoping to utilize the other firm's established global sales network. Despite the failure of the merger talks, Bennie said soon after that "we're still convinced that a larger sales force would give us the kind of marketing clout we need. I still believe that it's possible for us to become a global operation". Not long after WordStar merged with Spinnaker Software Corporation and SoftKey Software Products Inc. to form SoftKey International. Delrina subsequently signed deals with Wallace Computer Services, UARCO and NCR Corporation in an effort to gain greater sales distribution of its products.

=== Development of WinFax ===
In a deliberate attempt to diversify the business, The Company chose to move into the fax software market with its WinFax product. Software developer Tony Davis (another South African expatriate who had moved to Canada) was initially hired as a consultant to work on the forms line of products in the late 1980s, soon afterwards becoming part of that team. In his spare time he developed a prototype of what would become the first WinFax product, with the agreement that Delrina would be its publisher. In 1990 Delrina devoted a relatively small space to this new product at that year's COMDEX (a computer trade show), under a sign that said simply: "Send a Fax from Your PC". It garnered the most attention of any Delrina product being demonstrated at that show. This interest convinced the founding partners of the commercial viability of the product. Tony Davis went on to sell his product idea to Delrina, and stayed on as its lead software architect and designer.

The initial version of WinFax only worked on fax modems containing a specific chipset, and was only capable of sending faxes; it could not receive them. This was remedied with the launch of the WinFax PRO 2.0 product during the summer of 1991. One of the key factors that differentiated this version of WinFax from other fax software packages of the time was the deliberate attempt to make the program compatible with all fax/modems. Prior to the introduction of WinFax PRO 2.0, competitors concentrated primarily on building software that would only work with a single brand of fax/modem hardware. At the same time that it launched its WinFax PRO 2.0 product, Delrina also announced an OEM version of the same product designed to be bundled with new fax/modems. Within a few months, eight modem manufacturers had agreed to bundle this OEM version (called "WinFax LITE") of the program along with their own product. By the summer of the following year this number had grown to 50 OEM partnerships with various fax-modem and computer system manufacturers to bundle the "LITE" version of Delrina's WinFax software with their own products. By February 1993 this number had grown to over 100 OEM partnerships.

Bundling the LITE version of WinFax proved to be lucrative for Delrina. Whenever a person used the program for the first time and submitted their registration information by fax to the company, Delrina would subsequently mail the user an upgrade offer for the PRO version. This sales technique proved to be very effective, and the firm ended up making most of its sales from these upgrades.

In order to reach Apple computer users in this marketplace Delrina acquired Solutions Inc. and their BackFax software for the Macintosh platform in December 1991, which would become "Delrina Fax Pro". A version of the program was also designed for use in DOS ("DosFax PRO") which was launched in June 1992.

Initially looking for ways to further improve its electronic forms software, in November 1991 Delrina had attempted to buy two associated firms that produced Optical Character Recognition (OCR) software, with the intention of incorporating OCR functionality into its forms products. The acquisition deal fell through, though by Fall 1992 Delrina had made a deal with Caere Corporation to include its AnyFax OCR software within its products. This functionality was incorporated into WinFax PRO 3.0 in late 1992, and subsequently in FormFlow Despite the agreement with Caere, the subsequent version of WinFax used Xerox's TextBridge OCR engine instead.

Based on strong sales of WinFax, by October 1992 Delrina posted its first profitable quarter in three years. At the same time, the firm also announced its intention to acquire other software firms that sold into the consumer software market.

=== Acquisition of Amaze Inc. ===
In October 1992 Delrina acquired Amaze Inc., based out of Kirkland, Washington. The firm created daily planner software, providing time management features while providing some humour by featuring licensed cartoon strips like Cathy, Bloom County, B.C. and The Far Side. The firm became a wholly owned subsidiary of Delrina in a deal which also paid down Amaze's $3 million (U.S.) debt and placed two of the firm's directors on Delrina's board. These two individuals were Rowland Hanson, former VP Corporate Communications for Microsoft and George Clut.

==== Berkeley Systems Inc. v. Delrina ====
A scene from the revamped "Censored Toaster Module" issued after the court case

One of Delrina's screensaver products was based on the licensed Bloom County characters Opus the Penguin and Bill the Cat. The initial Opus 'n Bill screensaver, launched in 1993, landed the company in court as its Death Toasters module depicted Opus taking shots at a number of flying toasters, a well-known emblem in Berkeley System's Flying Toasters module from their After Dark screensaver. Berkeley Systems sued for copyright and trademark infringement. The following court case of Berkeley Systems Inc. v. Delrina was fought by Delrina on the basis that a software-based parody should fall under the same First Amendment protection offered to the press.

A preliminary injunction was filed against Delrina in September 1993 which halted the sale of the product, and subsequently forced a recall of it through the court. The case drew political satirist Mark Russell to speak in defense of Delrina, who argued in favour of the screensaver as a valid parody, while the estate of composer Irving Berlin sided with Berkeley. Commenting on the case involving his characters, cartoonist Berkeley Breathed said: "If David Letterman can depict the NBC peacock wearing men's boxer shorts, then Delrina should be able to plug a flying toaster with hot lead".

Judge Eugene Lynch found in favour of Berkeley, citing that a commercial software product was not subject to the same exemptions as parodist literature, and that the toasters were too similar in design. The total cost of the court case and the recalled product was roughly $150,000 U.S.

In the court case, it was also cited that the design for winged toasters was not original and that the Berkeley Systems' design was itself derived from the Jefferson Airplane album Thirty Seconds Over Winterland, which also used flying toasters adorned with wings. Berkeley argued that the firm was unaware of the previous artwork until 1991, and that the album cover's toasters had clocks in addition to their wings. Jefferson Airplane later sued Berkeley Systems in turn for the use of the same flying toaster emblem. The rock group lost the case as they did not trademark the album cover at the time of publication.

The court decision was interpreted by the writer L. Ray Patterson as an erosion of First Amendment rights over the increasing protection provided to copyright holders.

While Delrina lost the court case, the publicity it generated was substantial, with coverage in over a thousand newspapers across North America, resulting in consumers turning out in droves to buy the offending program before it could be recalled.

Delrina subsequently removed the wings from the toasters and replaced them with propellers in order to avoid trademark infringement. The module was also renamed from "Death Toasters" to "Censored Toaster Module". Thanks to the publicity from the court case, sales of this new version ended up being triple what had been expected. Updated modules for this particular screensaver were sold for the next couple of years.

Josef Zankowicz, who managed the firm's publicity during this period, later commented: "We had the feeling that we might get sued—actually, we prayed to get sued. Because by suing us, the number one player in the marketplace opened up the door. Anyone can create an interesting product, spend $10 million and create awareness of it. But it's another thing to create a product and spend one-tenth that amount and create twice as much awareness."

This division of the firm at its height only represented less than 15% of the company's total revenues.

=== Success of WinFax ===
The increasing sales of the WinFax product lead to significant growth in revenues for the firm; by 1992 its sales had climbed to $19,208,420, and more than doubling the next year to $48,583,932. The product soon overtook that of the initial forms product in terms of revenues, and within a few years of its launch, WinFax would account for 80% of the company's revenues. By 1994 the firm had sold more than 3 million copies of WinFax, and it regularly featured in the "Top 10" lists of software applications sold during this period.

The rapid growth in sales of this product was unexpected, with Bennie quoted in an interview from late 1993 as saying "the success of WinFax really caught us by surprise". With the success of the WinFax product, the company grew rapidly. By early 1993 the number of employees had grown to 250, and by the end of the year to 350. The increasing success of the WinFax product consequently led to significant strains on the firm to handle the increasing volume of calls to its Technical Support department, as each of the over 300 modems on the market at the time had their own nuances in how they implemented the fax data standard. Delrina spent roughly $800,000 in an improved telephone infrastructure in an attempt to get wait times to under five minutes. In December 1993 Delrina hired 40 additional people to help alleviate the growing number of calls to the firm for technical support. By the end of 1994 the situation had improved to the point where noted industry commentator Robert X. Cringely put Delrina in his shortlist of firms providing "exceptional" product support.

In order to further enhance the appeal of its new flagship product, in 1993 the firm established a Communication Services division, designed to tap into the commercial market. The firm started making deals with major telecommunication companies, such as BellSouth and MCI Inc. in preparation for the services the firm was about to offer. In November of that year the division launched its Fax Broadcast service. The Fax Broadcast service allowed subscribers to upload a single fax and a recipient list to Delrina. Systems at Delrina would then send out the fax to the recipients on that list, to a maximum of 500 fax numbers. A subsequent Fax Mailbox feature—which enabled subscribers to remotely access both fax and voice messages from a single phone number—was initially held up following a dispute with AlphaNet Telecom for the rights to the technology. This dispute was resolved by June 1994, though with both sides publicly disputing the story of the other, and with AlphaNet receiving an undisclosed sum in compensation.

By late 1994 the firm was considered one of the fastest-growing software companies in North America, and employed over 500 people, most located at its offices in Toronto. The firm's financial situation improved greatly, and by February 1995 Delrina was reported to have captured almost three-quarters of the fax software market, was debt-free and had $40 million in the bank. The firm was shipping 200,000 units of WinFax a month, and had an installed base of four million users. The cost of doing business had also improved, as the firm's cost of sales was now 25% of net sales, down from 30% the previous fiscal year, improving the firm's gross profits.

=== Impact of Windows 95 ===
In November 1992 Skapinker met Bill Gates at a Microsoft-sponsored dinner where he asked whether there were any plans to include any fax functionality in their forthcoming operating system (which could become Windows 95). Gates replied that there were plans to include "base-level fax capability" in the next version of Windows, and suggested that Skapinker get in touch with his development staff in order to produce a value-added product for it.

The firm decided to work on a suite of applications designed to be an enhancement on what was to be available in Windows 95. In response to a question about Windows 95, Bennie responded by saying: "We are quite convinced that on top of Windows 95, we can build four different applications and will encompass fax, data, telephony or digital voice, and Internet access". This would later become the CommSuite 95 product.

In 1994 the firm acquired AudioFile, a company that specialized in computer-based voice technology. The company created a product called TalkWorks, which enabled users to use certain fax/modems as a voice mail client.

Seeing a growing business in online communications utilities, Delrina licensed Hilgraeve's HyperACCESS terminal emulator system in 1993, and used it as the basis for the initial version of its WinComm online communications software. The initial version of the product was originally bundled with WinFax as part of the Delrina Communications Suite, but in March 1994 was issued as a standalone product. It was a relative latecomer to the market, which was then dominated at the time by Datastorm's Procomm series of communications software.

Delrina tried to expand aggressively into this market space, first by acquiring the Canadian online bulletin board service CRS Online, and then using it as a distribution channel for free versions of its WinComm LITE and DOS-based FreeComm products in March 1995.

When the Internet was opened to commercial interests in the mid-1990s, Delrina started to expand in this nascent market space with their Cyberjack 7.0 product, launched in December 1995. Created by a development team based in South Africa, it included a Web browser, Usenet news reader, ftp client, IRC and integration with the Microsoft Exchange email program. The program used an interesting variant of the now-common bookmark, using a "Guidebook" to store information for various Internet addresses.

CommSuite 95 shipped later that same month, bundling WinFax PRO 7.0 along with WinComm PRO 7.0, TalkWorks and the Cyberjack suite of Internet components.

With the release of Windows 95 in August 1995, Delrina was now competing directly against Microsoft in the fax/electronic communications marketplace, as Windows 95 included a basic faxing application as an accessory, along with a licensed version of Hilgraeve's HyperTerminal communication package, (which was also used as the basis for Delrina's own WinComm program). While these applications offered only rudimentary fax and online communication services in comparison to the mature Delrina products, Microsoft was perceived as a potentially serious future competitor in the communications market space. The release of the initial version of Microsoft's Internet Explorer in late 1995 as a free product effectively killed off the early emerging market for non-free browsers, creating a market where Delrina's Cyberjack browser could not hope to compete.

=== Acquisition by Symantec and aftermath ===
In late Spring of 1995, Delrina Chairman Dennis Bennie met with Symantec CEO Gordon Eubanks to discuss the possibility of merging the two firms. In September 1995 Delrina's founders—who owned a controlling interest in the firm—sold the firm to Symantec in a stock deal worth $415 million US. The deal was first announced on July 6 of that year, with shareholders from both firms approving the merger on November 20. The merger was completed on November 22, 1995, and Delrina officially became part of Symantec. The deal made the merged company the fifth largest American software firm at the time. The firm became the "Delrina Group" within Symantec, which brought under its control other communication software products that belonged to the parent firm, such as pcAnywhere. Bennie joined the Board of Symantec and was also appointed an Executive Vice President.

At its height the company employed more than 700 people worldwide, the majority based in Canada. Symantec was following a general trend of large American firms buying smaller Canadian software companies. Other contemporaneous examples include Softimage and Zoom-it being bought by Microsoft, and Alias being bought by Silicon Graphics.

Parts of the company were subsequently sold off, such as the sale of Delrina's Electronic Forms Division to JetForm in September 1996. JetForm, which later changed its name to Accelio, was in turn bought by Adobe Systems. Adobe officially discontinued the electronic forms products in 2004. Creative Wonders bought the rights to the Echo Lake multimedia product, which was re-shaped as an introductory program on multimedia and re-released as Family Album Creator.

Though the market for fax software would shrink significantly as the use of email became more pervasive, WinFax brought in significant revenue for Symantec; a year after the merger sales of fax software accounted for 10% of Symantec's revenues.

=== Post-Delrina ===
Delrina was a catalyst for entrepreneurial talent and greatness, as many of the principals and employees of Delrina went on to find new successful ventures. With investments from Skapinker and Amato, and Bennie as lead Director, Davis went on to form Lanacom, which developed an early Internet "push content" product. This firm and its technology were sold just over a year after its inception to Backweb, a NASDAQ listed software company; Davis remained president and Bennie was brought on as Director.

Skapinker and Davis then went on to found Brightspark, a software venture capital firm. Brightspark Ventures raised a number of VC Funds from Canadian Financial institutions raising $60m in 1999 and $55m in 2004. Brightspark employed a number of ex-Delrina employees including Allen Lau, Eva Lau, Sandy Pearlman, Marg Vaillancourt. Brightspark Ventures has twice won the Canadian Venture Capital Association "Deal of the Year Award", for the sale of ThinkDynamics to IBM and for the sale of Radian6 to Salesforce.com.

Bennie would move on to found XDL Capital, a company which manages venture capital funds. XDL Capital—appropriately named after "Ex Delrina"—raised money for two funds: XDL Ventures (XDL), raising $25 million in 1997, and XDL Intervest (XDLI), raising $155 million in 1999. David Latner, former legal counsel for Delrina, was a partner in both funds, and Amato (former partner, Delrina) was an advisor and major investor to XDL Capital. He also participated in several investee companies as a Director and/or Advisor.

XDL Intervest focuses primarily on internet-specific entrepreneurial companies and Bennie brought in two new principals: Tony Van Marken, former CEO of Architel Systems Corp. (ASYC), and Michael Bregman, former CEO of Second Cup Ltd. (T.SKL). XDL has assembled an established board and advisory team, which includes Canadian billionaire Robert Young, a native of Hamilton, Ontario, who co-founded Red Hat Inc (RHAT) and remains its chairman. Several of XDL's venture investments were in companies started or run by ex-Delrina employees who founded successful businesses, fostered by the innovative and entrepreneurial environment of Delrina. A few of the successes today are listed below:

Delano Founded by Bahman Koohestani, another early developer at Delrina, was a company which developed e-business solutions for corporations. XDL Capital provided seed capital prior to Delano listing publicly. Bennie was the chairman. Delano was listed on NASDAQ (DTEC) was subsequently sold to divine in 2003.

Pinpoint Software Corporation a supplier of software solutions for managing networked PCs, was founded in 1992 by Lou Ryan. Ryan was CEO & President with Bennie acting as director. Pinpoint was partially funded by XDL Capital. Pinpoint changed its name to ClickNet Software in 1998. Uniting the company name with the successful ClickNet product family name strengthens the product and corporate identity. The company was eventually renamed Entercept Security Technologies Inc. In 2004, Entercept was sold to Network Associates for $120M where they incorporated Entercept's technology into its McAfee line of antivirus protection and other security products.

Protégé Software was formed in 1996 and was founded by Larry Levy, Delrina's European Managing Director. Levy acted as president and CEO with Bennie as the principal investor. The company raised a $120M round of finance with XDL Intervest participating in 2003. Protégé has successfully launched 20 U.S. companies in Europe, nine of which are among Red Herring Top 50 Private Companies. In addition, five of these companies have gone public during Protégé's tenure with them. The company was ultimately sold to various buyers including Warburg Pincus after the internet bubble burst.

Netect Ltd., an XDL financed venture developing network security software, was purchased by Bindview Development Corporation (NASDAQ:BVEW) in 2001. Marc Camm (Ex Delrina GM Desktop Communications Business Unit) was brought on by Bennie to manage Netect. After the company was purchased, Camm joined Bindview as the E.V.P. of Marketing. Prior to joining Netect, Marc was the general manager of Symantec and systems group product manager for Microsoft Canada.

Within a few years all of Delrina's major market focuses—fax and form software—would be overtaken or superseded by email, e-commerce and the Internet. Daily planning software remains a niche market, and the immersive 3D environment used for creating multimedia presentations has (so far) fallen by the wayside in favour of more traditional user interfaces. Symantec ended support for its final WinFax PRO product in June 2006.

Delrina is best remembered by its former employees as an incubator for ideas and for providing industry experience to the many people who would go on to work at subsequent software and hardware companies, many in the Toronto region. A forum exists on Yahoo called "xdelrina", where many former employees of the firm continue to keep in contact with each other.

== Software and services ==
=== Forms products ===
The company's first product was PerForm, an electronic forms software package. PerForm and its sibling product, FormFlow, (which was aimed at workgroup and enterprise-level electronic forms processing and delivery) became one of the best selling products in its market. Delrina competed against WordPerfect's Informs package, Microsoft's Electronic Forms Designer, Novell's Informs, Lotus Development's Forms and JetForm's JetForm Workflow software.

PerForm and FormFlow were designed to allow users to create self-contained form applications which could be passed back and forth across a network. Both PerForm and FormFlow consisted of two distinct parts: "Designer", which created the form application, and "Filler", so users could submit the forms either by fax or, later, e-mail. The program could ease repetitive fill tasks, include mandatory fields, and use an input mask to accept only data entered in a valid format. The information could be saved and restored in a dBase file that used a Public-key cryptography system to encrypt the data running from client to server.

The initial version of PerForm was designed for the Graphics Environment Manager (better known as "GEM"), a DOS-based windowing system. Later versions of this program, known as PerForm PRO, were designed to work under Windows 3.1 and subsequent Windows operating systems. PerForm PRO 3.0 included integration with Delrina's own WinFax software, and included a range of automation tools.

As PerForm captured the retail market, it became apparent that there was a need for electronics forms delivery and processing at the workgroup and enterprise levels. In 1994 Delrina FormFlow was released, which was designed to meet this need. One of the key features of FormFlow 1.1 was forms integration with email, and its Filler module was available for DOS, Windows and Unix.

=== WinFax ===
The "About" screen for WinFax 3.0 from 1992, depicting several of its principal programmers.

WinFax enabled computers equipped with fax-modems to send faxes directly to stand-alone fax machines or other similarly equipped computers.

Several versions of the WinFax product were released over the next few years, initially for Windows 3.x and then a Windows 95-based version. WinFax PRO 2.0 for Windows was released in July 1991. The Windows versions were also localized to major European and Asian languages. The company made further in-roads by establishing tie-ins with modem manufacturers such as USRobotics and Supra that bundled simple versions of the product (called "WinFax LITE") that offered basic functionality. Those wanting more robust features were encouraged to upgrade to the "PRO" version, and were offered significant discounts over the standalone retail version. All of this rapidly established WinFax as the de facto fax software. By 1994 almost one hundred companies were bundling versions of WinFax in with their own product, including IBM, Compaq, AST Research, Gateway 2000, Intel and Hewlett-Packard.

WinFax PRO 3.0 was launched in late 1992 for Windows 3.x machines. This was followed by a version for Macintosh systems. The "Lite" version of WinFax 3.0 was bundled as OEM software by a number of fax-modem manufacturers, which was later superseded by WinFax Lite 4.0 a couple of years later.

The release of WinFax PRO 4.0 in March 1994 brought together a number of key features and technologies. It introduced an improved OCR engine, introduced improvements aimed specifically at mobile fax users, better on-screen fax viewing capabilities and a focus on consistency and usability of the interface. It also included for the first time the ability to integrate directly with popular new email products such as cc:Mail and Microsoft Mail. It was preceded by a Workgroup version of the same product, which allowed a number of users to share a single fax modem on a networked system. The stand-alone version of the product was also later bundled with a grayscale scanner, and sold as WinFax Scanner.

The final Delrina-branded version of WinFax was WinFax PRO 7.0, which shipped in late 1995, the subsequent version 8.0 being a Symantec product. There was no intervening version 5.0 or 6.0, and the jump to version 7.0 was purely a marketing decision, based on keeping up with the suite of products in Microsoft Office which were then at the same number. It also reflected the development effort required to develop the first full 32-bit application version, designed to work with the Windows 95 operating system, which set it apart from its competition at the time.

By the time WinFax PRO 7.0 was being sold from retail shelves, Delrina had been acquired by Symantec.

=== Multimedia products ===
The product box cover for the "Opus 'n Bill BrainSaver" screensaver product

Screensavers were designed to ensure that there would be no phosphor burn-in of images left on a CRT-based screen. Delrina added sound and basic interactivity with its series of screensaver products, arguably qualifying it as an early form of multimedia.

Under Delrina several of the already-licensed cartoons brought over from their acquisition of Amaze Inc. were further developed into screensaver applications. The "Opus 'n Bill Brain Saver", which would land the company in court for copyright violations, was launched in 1993. Subsequent screensavers include a licensed version based on the first Flintstone live-action movie, and "The Scott Adams Dilbert Screen Saver Collection" which came out in September 1994.

==== Echo Lake ====
The rustic virtual desktop environment for the "multimedia family album" software Echo Lake

A notable multimedia software program produced by Delrina was Echo Lake, an early form of scrapbook software that came out in June 1995. During development it was touted internally as a "cross [of] Quark Xpress and Myst". It featured an immersive 3D environment where a user could manipulate objects within a virtual desktop in a virtual office and assemble video and audio clips along with images, and then send them as either a virtual book other users of the program could then access, or its content could be printed. It was an innovative product for its time, and ultimately was hampered by the inability of many users to easily input or playback their own multimedia content into a computer from that period.

== List of software ==
=== Electronic forms ===
- PerForm – October 1988
- PerForm PRO – August 1990
- PerForm Tracer – June 1991
- PerForm PRO Plus – August 1992
- FormFlow – October 1993
- FormFlow 1.1 – June 1994
- PerForm for Windows 3.0 – November 1994

=== Multimedia ===
- The Far Side Daily Planner Calendar Publisher 3.0 – September 1993 (Note: The Far Side Daily Planner software was originally published by Amaze Inc. in September 1991.)
- Delrina Intermission 4.0 Screen Saver – October 1993
- Opus 'n Bill Brain Saver – October 1993
- The Far Side Screen Saver Collection – June 1994
- Opus 'n Bill On the Road Again Screensaver – September 1994
- The Scott Adams Dilbert Screen Saver Collection – September 1994
- Echo Lake – June 1995

=== Fax ===
- WinFax 1.0 – December 1990
- WinFax PRO 2.0 – June 1991
- WinFax Lite – April 1992
- DosFax Lite – April 1992
- DosFax PRO 2.0 – June 1992
- WinFax PRO 3.0 – November 1992
- Delrina Fax PRO 1.5 for Macintosh – September 1993
- WinFax PRO for Networks – November 1993
- WinFax PRO 4.0 – March 1994
- WinFax Scanner – 1994
- WinFax PRO 7.0 – November 1995
- WinFax PRO 7.5 (bundled with TalkWorks) – October 1996
- WinFax PRO 8.0 (bundled with TalkWorks PRO) – March 1997
- TalkWorks PRO 2.0 – August 1998
- WinFax PRO 9.0 – August 1998
- TalkWorks PRO 3.0 – August 1999
- WinFax PRO 10.0 – February 2000

=== Online communications ===
- Delrina Communications Suite (WinComm and WinFax) – October 1993
- WinComm Pro – March 1994
- Cyberjack – December 1995
- CommSuite 95 – December 1995
