= Enrique Salem =

American venture capitalist (born 1965)

- Born: November 1965 (age 60); Barranquilla, Colombia
- Education: Dartmouth College
- Occupation: Venture capitalist
- Employer: Partner at Bain Capital Ventures

Enrique Salem (born 1965) was the president and CEO of software company Symantec from 2009 until 2012, and was a member of the U.S. President's Management Advisory Board. Prior to being CEO of Symantec he was the COO of Symantec.

== Biography ==
Salem was born on November 2, 1965, in Barranquilla, Colombia, to two Christian Palestinian parents. He attended Dartmouth College, where he earned a Bachelor's of Arts (BA) degree in Computer Science.

He was a Vice President at Peter Norton Computing which was acquired by Symantec in 1990, and he was a manager of the project to create the Norton Desktop for Windows. He left Symantec, only to return to the company via the Brightmail acquisition.

Salem was the CEO of Brightmail, a company that made an email program designed to screen out spam email. Brightmail was acquired by Symantec in 2004. He was at Brightmail for almost two years.

Salem spent a total of 19 years at Symantec. He took over from John W. Thompson as Symantec CEO in April 2009 through July 2012. He was forced out of the company by its board of directors in July 2012.

Salem joined Bain Capital Ventures in 2014, where he focuses on infrastructure software and services with a specialization in cybersecurity. He serves on the boards of several Bain Capital Venture portfolio companies, including DocuSign, and serves independently on the boards of Mandiant (MNDT), Atlassian (TEAM), and ForeScout (FSCT). He currently serves on the board of directors for a number of privately held startups including Cloudgenix, Attivo Networks, ShieldX, HYCU, Leapyear, Awake Security, ShiftLeft, Red Balloon Security, BetterCloud, Rubrik and VISO TRUST.

Salem also had held vice-president positions at Security Pacific Merchant Bank, Ask Jeeves and Oblix Inc. Salem served on the Board of City Year San Jose from 2015 through 2018 and is now a trustee of City Year.

He was named 2004 Entrepreneur of the Year by Ernst & Young, and 2007 Corporate Executive of the Year by Hispanic Net.

Salem became a member of President Barack Obama’s U.S. President's Management Advisory Board in March, 2011 and served until the end of the administration.
