= AudioFile =

AudioFile may refer to:

- AudioFile (company), a software company purchased by Delrina
- AudioFile (magazine), a magazine that reviews audiobooks
- AudioFile, a TechTV original series about music

== See also ==
- Audio file, format for storing digital audio content
- Audiophile
