= Sunil Paul =

American businessman (born 1964)

- Born: November 12, 1964 (age 61); Punjab, India
- Education: Vanderbilt University
- Occupation: CEO at Spring Free EV
- Children: 2

Sunil Paul (born November 12, 1964) is an Internet entrepreneur who launched Spring Free EV in 2021. He has previously founded companies such as Brightmail and Freeloader, Inc. He was the co-founder and CEO of Sidecar, a San Francisco, based an on-demand peer-to-peer taxi service that later pivoted away from ridesharing toward deliveries of various items.

== Early life and background ==
Paul was born in Punjab, India. At the age of 4 his parents immigrated to the United States where he was raised in Nashville, Tennessee. Paul holds a B.E. in Electrical Engineering from Vanderbilt University.

== Career ==
Starting in 1994, Paul served as an Internet Product Manager and Director of Corporate Development for America Online, Inc.

In 1996, Paul co-founded and launched his first startup with Mark Pincus, Freeloader, Inc., a web-based push technology service. Freeloader was backed by Fred Wilson and Softbank. Paul served as the Chief Executive Officer from January 1996 - June 1996 when Freeloader, Inc. was acquired by Individual, Inc., for $38 million. In 1998 Paul founded Brightmail (previously known as "Bright Light Technologies"), an e-mail filtering company, and raised $55 million in three rounds of venture capital led by Accel, TCV and Symantec. Brightmail was acquired by Symantec on May 19, 2004 for $370 million in cash.

Paul is an angel investor with investments in companies including LinkedIn, and Solazyme. In February 2012 Paul co-founded Sidecar, an on-demand peer-to-peer ridesharing service with Jahan Khanna, Adrian Fortino, and Nick Allen. Sidecar was based in San Francisco, CA and raised $10 million Series A funding in October 2012 from Lightspeed Venture Partners and Google Ventures. Sidecar operated in Seattle, Los Angeles, Austin, Philadelphia, Chicago, Boston, New York City and Washington, D.C. Sidecar closed on December 31, 2015. The company raised $39 million over its life and sold to General Motors in January 2016. The price of the transaction was not disclosed, although a person familiar with the matter said it was less than the roughly $39 million that Sidecar raised.

Paul launched Spring Free EV in 2021, a fintech company designed to have climate level impact by accelerating adoption of electric vehicles.
