= PernixData =

Software company based in San Jose, California that was founded in 2012

- Type: Subsidiary
- Industry: Storage virtualization
- Founded: 2012; 14 years ago
- Headquarters: San Jose California
- Key people: Poojan Kumar, CEO; Satyam Vaghani, CTO
- Products: FVP; Architect
- Parent: Nutanix
- Website: www.pernixdata.com

PernixData was a software company based in San Jose, California. PernixData was founded in 2012, and acquired in 2016. Its main product is PernixData FVP, which is software for virtualizing server-side flash memory and random-access memory (RAM).

== History ==
PernixData was co-founded in February 2012 by Poojan Kumar, CEO, and Satyam Vaghani, CTO. Initial capital investment came from Lightspeed Venture Partners with individual investments from Mark Leslie, founding chairman and CEO of Veritas; John Thomson, CEO of Virtual Instruments and Microsoft Board Member; and Lane Bess, chief operating officer at Zscaler and former CEO of Palo Alto Networks. A second round of funding in May 2013 came from Kleiner Perkins Caufield & Byers and the original investors. In August 2014, PernixData raised Series C financing, led by Menlo Ventures with contributions from previous investors. Investments in that round were also made by Marc Benioff, chairman and CEO of Salesforce; Jim Davidson, of Silver Lake Partners and Steve Luczo, chairman and CEO of Seagate Technology.

In August 2013, PernixData announced its FVP software product. In July, 2016, there were reports of potential sale of the company. PernixData was acquired by Nutanix in August, 2016.

== Products and competition ==
PernixData FVP virtualizes server-side flash memory and random-access memory (RAM), software intended to scale storage performance independent of capacity. In 2013, PernixData FVP was only available for VMware's cloud computing platform vSphere 5, but Kumar indicated plans to ready FVP for various hypervisors, including Microsoft Hyper-V. Version 2.0 of FVP was announced in August 2014, alongside various new editions of the product (Enterprise, Standard, VDI and Essentials Plus).

Competing VMware-focused flash virtualization technologies include Virtunet Systems' VirtuCache, SanDisk’s FlashSoft, Proximal Data's Autocache, and VMware's own vSphere Flash Read Cache (vFRC). PernixData's FVP and Virtunet Systems' VirtuCache distinguish themselves from VMware's own vFRC by adding write caching and clustering.

== See also ==
- Hybrid array
