= Panorama9 =

- Developer: Panorama9
- Type: Network Management
- Website: www.panorama9.com

Panorama9 is a cloud-based service within network management.

== The company ==
Panorama9 was founded in 2010 in Copenhagen and later moved their headquarters to San Francisco, California, with some sales and development teams continuing from Copenhagen.

== Services ==
The service is provided by the company Panorama9 and is a cloud-based remote monitoring and management Remote Monitoring and Management (RMM) service.

It consists of a hosted dashboard, which displays the status of all devices on an enterprise's network, and provides a set of reports on inventory of hardware, software and users. The service operates by collating data transmitted from agents installed on each monitored device.

In November 2011, the service introduced an interactive network map displaying real-time information.

Zendesk and Panorama9 and Zendesk announced a partnership in May 2012 .

An Managed Service Provider (MSP) control panel was introduced in 2014, which enables service providers to manage multiple clients from one dashboard.

In 2017, the company released a mobile app.

== The company ==
Panorama9 was founded in 2010 in Copenhagen and later moved their headquarters to San Francisco, California with some sales and development teams continuing from Copenhagen.

== See also ==
- Software Asset Management
- IT Asset Management
- SNMP
- List of mergers and acquisitions by Symantec
