= PerForm =

Defunct computer software

Sample form created in Delrina PerForm Designer, circa 1994

PerForm and PerForm PRO were electronic form programs, initially designed to run under GEM for MS-DOS. Later versions were for Windows 3.1, at which point it was succeeded by FormFlow.

The initial version of PerForm was created in 1988 and was the first product released by Canadian software firm Delrina, which became best known for its later fax software program, WinFax. Chief Technical Officer Bert Amato and President of the company Mark Skapinker came up with the idea for the product while working as consultants that what their clients wanted was a way to fill in forms electronically, rather than an easier way to create paper-based forms from a computer. The program consisted of two parts: a form design module which gave users a graphical user interface for creating and arranging form elements, using tools largely familiar to those using desktop publishing or paint programs of the era, and a separate form filling program which would display the resulting form that the user could then fill in. Those entering information into the forms could not change or alter the forms; they were limited to adding information in the various form fields on screen. Some of the potential uses of the program included being able to create invoices, payment records, personnel and payroll forms, and just about any other standardized form that may have been required. Later versions of the program had some integration with Delrina's popular WinFax program, enabling users to fax material to clients based on information entered into PerForm.

There was significant and long-term uptake of electronic forms products within governmental agencies both in Canada and the United States, the latter spurred on in particular by the requirements of the Paperwork Reduction Act to reduce the total amount of paperwork handled by the United States government. One of the firm's early major software deals included a multi-year agreement to sell PerForm to the U.S. Navy in 1990. Soon after the software was installed on Compaq laptops that accompanied U.S. troops during the First Gulf War, where it was used to requisition "everything from Coca-Cola to privies". Other significant volume sales went to 3M and Rockwell International. What helped set apart Delrina's electronic forms from its competitors in product reviews included its easy-to-use interface, its extensive development tools, and its comparatively low price. It also scored highly when it came to workflow and routing functions as well as security features. In early 1991 InfoWorld selected PerForm Pro as its "Product of the Year" in the electronic forms category, and PC World Magazine gave the product its "Best Buy" designation. PerForm proved to be successful in its niche, effectively capturing the retail market by 1993.

The electronic forms division of Delrina was sold to JetForm in 1996. JetForm in turn was bought by Adobe, and the electronic forms products were officially discontinued in 2004.
