= ThoughtSpot =

American developer of business intelligence software

ThoughtSpot, Inc.
- Formerly: Scaligent Inc.
- Type: Private
- Industry: Analytics, business intelligence
- Founded: 2012; 14 years ago in Palo Alto, California, United States
- Founders: Ajeet Singh; Amit Prakash
- Headquarters: Mountain View, California
- Number of locations: 9
- Key people: Amit Prakash, co-founder; Ajeet Singh, co-founder and chairman; Ketan Karkhanis, CEO
- Revenue: ▲$100.2 Million(2019)
- Number of employees: 600
- Website: thoughtspot.com

ThoughtSpot, Inc. is a technology company that produces business intelligence analytics search software. The company is based in Mountain View, California, and was founded in 2012.

== History ==
ThoughtSpot was started in 2012 by Ajeet Singh (CEO) and Amit Prakash (CTO). The CEO and co-founder, Ajeet Singh, previously co-founded the company Nutanix. The CTO and co-founder, Amit Prakash, came from Google where he was responsible for one of the machine learning systems for Ads. In late 2012, ThoughtSpot raised $10.7 million in Series A funding led by Lightspeed Venture Partners. In 2014, the company raised $30 million in Series B funding led by Khosla Ventures.

In January 2016, the company opened an office in London. In February 2016, ThoughtSpot announced that it had increased its revenue by 810 percent over the previous year. In May 2016, ThoughtSpot raised $50 million in Series C funding led by General Catalyst Partners. In October 2016, the company expanded its series C funding with an investment from Hewlett Packard Pathfinder. As part of the investment, ThoughtSpot entered the Pathfinder program and began selling its software on Hewlett Packard Enterprise infrastructure.

In May 2018, the company raised $145 million in Series D funding from Sapphire Ventures, Lightspeed Ventures, Khosla Ventures, General Catalyst and others to expand its AI based analytics platform. At the time, the company was valued at over $1 billion. In August, ThoughtSpot appointed former Nutanix President Sudheesh Nair as its new CEO.

In March 2019, ThoughtSpot relocated their headquarters from Palo Alto to Sunnyvale. In August 2019, the company raised $248 million in Series E funding from Silver Lake, Sapphire Ventures, and Geodesic Capital.

By 2020, the company had $100 million in annual recurring revenue. In January 2020, the company hired several new executives for a potential initial public offering later that year. In November, the company announced a $100 million series F funding round that valued it at $4.2 billion.

On March 5, 2021, ThoughtSpot partnered with Indian information technology company Tech Mahindra. Also in March, the company announced it had raised another $20 million in venture capital investments from partner Snowflake Inc.'s venture capital arm Snowflake Ventures. Also in March, ThoughtSpot made its first acquisition by acquiring SQL-based analytics software startup SeekWell for $20 million. In May, ThoughtSpot acquired data integration company Diyotta.

On June 26, 2023, ThoughtSpot acquired business intelligence startup Mode Analytics for $200 million in cash and stock.

On September 27, 2024, ThoughtSpot appointed Ketan Karkhanis, former Executive Vice President and General Manager of Sales Cloud at Salesforce, as its new CEO.

== Technology ==
ThoughtSpot enables non-technical individuals to perform self-service data analysis. ThoughtSpot's software can analyze data from sources like Snowflake and Databricks, and integrates with the Google Cloud Platform and Amazon Web Services. Originally, ThoughtSpot was focused on selling licensed business intelligence software. Over time, it moved to a Software as a Service (SaaS) model and to self-service analytics, in which a business user retrieves insights by entering a query.

The company introduced ThoughtSpot Monitor, a tool that checks information for changing patterns or trends, in 2019 as part of its ThoughtSpot 6 software. In 2021, ThoughtSpot added connectors called SpotApps that are each designed to integrate with different cloud services. Its ThoughtSpot Everywhere self-service analytics tools were introduced in 2021. In November 2024, it added a feature called Spotter to understand natural language queries requesting data analysis. In July 2025, ThoughtSpot released its Agentic MCP Server; through it Spotter can interact with other AI tools and unstructured data using the Model Context Protocol.
