= Fast Track =

Fast Track, Fast track, or Fasttrack may refer to:

== Processes and systems ==
- Fast track (FDA), a U.S. Food and Drug Administration expedited review program
- Fast-track Approvals Act 2024, New Zealand planning legislation
- Fast track (trade), the authority of the U.S. President to broker trade agreements with limited congressional oversight
- Fast Track (Warner Bros. Movie World), a virtual queuing system
- Fast Track (Wet'n'Wild Water World), a virtual queuing system
- Fast-track construction, a scheduling technique

== Arts and entertainment ==
- Fast Track (American TV series), a 1997–1998 action drama series
- Fast Track (British TV programme), a 2013–2014 travel programme
- Fast Track, a FoxBusiness.com show formerly hosted by Anna Gilligan
- The Ex (2006 film) (working title Fast Track), an American comedy
- Fast Track: No Limits, a 2008 English-language German thriller film
- Fast Track (DC Comics) (Meena Dhawan), a fictional character
- Fasttrack (Ben 10), a fictional character
- Fast Tracks: The Computer Slot Car Construction Kit, a 1986 racing video game
- "Fast-Track", a song by Radiohead from the B-side of the single "Pyramid Song"

== Companies and products ==
- Fast Track (magazine), an Indian information technology monthly
- Fast Track, Inc., an American software development company
- Fast Track Racing, an American professional stock car racing team
- Fast Track, a UK-based research company that produced the 2007–2019 Sunday Times Fast Track 100 list

== Computing ==
- FastTrack, a peer-to-peer protocol
- FastTrack Schedule, a project management software program
- FastTrack Scripting Host, a scripting language for Windows IT system administrators

== See also ==
- Fastrac (disambiguation)
- Fastrack (disambiguation)
- FastTracker 2, music tracker software for DOS
- FasTracks, an expansion plan for public transportation in Denver, Colorado
- FasTrak, an electronic toll collection system in California
- CT Fastrak, a bus rapid transit system in Connecticut
