= Mark Skapinker =

Mark Skapinker is a Managing Partner at Brightspark, a software, Internet and Mobile venture capital firm with offices in Montreal, Quebec, Canada and Toronto, Ontario, Canada. Brightspark has twice won the Canadian Venture Capital Association "Deal of the Year Award" for its successful investments in ThinkDynamics (acquired by IBM) and Radian6 (acquired by Salesforce.com).

Born in South Africa, he immigrated to Canada where, along with Bert Amato and Dennis Bennie, he co-founded Delrina, where they devised its first product, the electronic form software PerForm. He served as Delrina's President. The firm was well known for its WinFax product and was acquired by Symantec in November 1995.

In 1997 he founded Balisoft Technologies, an Internet infrastructure company that created intelligent customer interaction software. This firm was merged with Servicesoft Technologies in 1999, which was in turn acquired by Broadbase Software in September 2000, and thereafter by Kana.

In 2008, Mark co-founded iStopOver.com, a Toronto-based Internet business focused on peer to peer travel with online ecommerce which was sold to 9Flats in 2012.

In 2000, Mark co-founded Brightspark Ventures in Toronto. For over 20 years, Brightspark has managed early stage and seed Venture Capital funds, with over $135 million under management. Sophie Forest has been a Managing Partner in Brightspark since 2004. Brightspark's investors include individual Canadian accredited investors, Family office and institutional investors.
