= Multi-track =

Multi-track may refer to:

- Multitrack recording, the process of mixing individual sound sources to a single recording
- Multi-track diplomacy, a method of conflict resolution
- Multi track, a process of civil litigation in England and Wales
  - Fast Track (disambiguation)
- Red Book (CD standard), for audio CD and DVD discs containing multiple tracks (songs)
- The BitTorrent multitracker feature, a peer-to-peer file sharing protocol used for distributing large amounts of data
