= Sidecar (company) =

Defunct American vehicle for hire company

Sidecar was a US-based vehicle for hire company that provided transportation and delivery services. It was founded in 2011 in San Francisco and closed on December 31, 2015.

== History ==
Sidecar was founded in September 2011 by Sunil Paul, CEO, Jahan Khanna, CTO, and Adrian Fortino. The company expanded its operations into Seattle, Los Angeles, Philadelphia and Austin. At the South By Southwest festival in 2013, Sidecar made all rides during the conference free. In 2013 the company started operating in Boston, New York City, Washington, D.C., Charlotte, Chicago, San Diego, Long Beach and Oakland.

=== Investments ===
Sidecar was backed by a number of wealthy investors including Union Square Ventures, Avalon Ventures, Lightspeed Venture Partners, Google Ventures, and Sir Richard Branson. The company raised US$10 million in series A funding from Google Ventures and Lightspeed Venture Partners in 2012.

=== Legal challenges and approval in California ===
In the fall of 2012, the California Public Utilities Commission issued a cease and desist letter to Sidecar (along with rideshare companies Lyft and Uber) and fined each $20,000. However, in 2013 an interim agreement was reached reversing those actions. In September 2013, the CPUC unanimously voted to make the agreement permanent, creating a new category of service called "transportation network company" to cover Lyft, UberX, and Sidecar, and making California the first state to recognize such services.

In 2013 the Philadelphia Parking Authority carried out a sting operation against Sidecar and shut it down as an "unauthorized service provider." However, Sidecar argued that its operation is not taxi service but "a way to organize ridesharing and carpooling."

=== Repositioning, shutdown ===
In February 2015, Sidecar announced a same-day service for local businesses whereby goods, food, and flowers were to be delivered to local consumers using its existing pool of drivers. Sidecar also announced its partnership with Yelp Eat24. By August 2015, most of Sidecar's business entailed making deliveries.

On December 29, 2015, Sidecar announced that it would shut down. On January 19, 2016, automaker General Motors acquired Sidecar's assets and intellectual property, and hired Khanna and 20 other employees. The purchase was a follow-up to GM's $500 million investment in Lyft.
