= Meeting Maker =

Meeting Maker is a cross-platform personal calendar and group scheduling software application from PeopleCube. First released in 1991 for Macintosh by ON Technology, support for other platforms followed in 1993 with Meeting Maker XP. Alongside Windows and Mac, native clients were released for OS/2 and Solaris, and later also for other platforms (HPUX, Linux). Some support was also introduced for mobile platforms like Apple Newton, PalmPilot and Windows CE. Although powerful, its user interface - aiming at uniformity across multiple platforms — was criticized as weak and not supporting all features of target platforms.

Meeting Maker is used by small and large businesses, universities, and other organizations. It enables users to view the availability of others, send out meeting invitations, accept/decline meetings directly from their calendar view, and reserve essential meeting resources such as conference rooms and A/V equipment. Several add-on modules are available for added functionality including Meeting Maker Mobile, providing remote calendar and email access from mobile devices, and Meeting Maker Connector for Outlook (MMCO) which integrates the Microsoft Outlook calendaring environment with Meeting Maker. Recent versions use NotifyLink for wireless synchronization, including support for BlackBerry, Palm Treo, and Windows Mobile Smartphones.
