= Fastrack =

Fastrack may refer to:

- Fastrack (bus rapid transit), a bus rapid transit scheme in Kent, England
- Fastrack (brand), an Indian fashion accessory brand
- FASTRACK, a New York City Subway maintenance program

== See also ==
- Fast Track (disambiguation)
- Fastrac (disambiguation)
- FasTrak, the electronic vehicle toll collection system used in California
- Fastrak, the brand name for the Transperth rail network in Perth, Western Australia from 1992 to 1995
