= WinFax =

Discontinued fax software

WinFax PRO
- Original author: Tony Davis
- Developer: Delrina
- Release: 1990; 36 years ago
- Stable release: 10.0 PRO / 2006
- Operating system: Windows, MS-DOS, Classic Mac OS
- Type: fax software
- License: Proprietary

WinFax (also known as WinFax PRO) is a discontinued Microsoft Windows-based software product developed and published by Delrina designed to let computers equipped with fax-modems communicate directly to stand-alone fax machines, or other similarly equipped computers.

== History ==
The product was created by developer Tony Davis at Toronto-based Delrina in 1990, and soon became the company's flagship product. Delrina started out by producing a set of electronic form products known as PerForm and later, FormFlow.

In 1990 Delrina devoted a relatively small space to WinFax at that year's COMDEX, where it easily garnered the most attention of any Delrina product being demonstrated at that show. This interest convinced Delrina of the commercial viability of the product. The rapid acceptance of this program, in the market soon overtook that of the initial forms product in terms of revenues, and within a few years of its launch, WinFax would account for 80% of the company's revenues.

Several versions of WinFax were released over the next few years, initially for Windows 3.x and then a Windows 95-based version. Versions were also created for the Mac ("Delrina Fax Pro") and MS-DOS ("DosFax"). The Windows versions were also localized to major European and Asian languages. The company made further inroads by establishing tie-ins with modem manufacturers such as USRobotics and Supra that bundled simple versions of the product (called "WinFax LITE") that offered basic functionality. Those wanting more robust features were encouraged to upgrade to the "PRO" version, and were offered significant discounts over the standalone retail version. All of this rapidly established WinFax as the de facto fax software. By 1994, almost 100 companies were bundling versions of WinFax, including IBM, Compaq, AST Research, Gateway 2000, Intel and Hewlett-Packard.

WinFax was frequently used by business travelers as an ad hoc printer. By connecting to a regular phone line, or to an office/hotel room phone via an adapter, a user could send a document to a fax machine (in an era when nearly all business class hotels had a fax machine at the front desk, but very few offered printers for guest use). While the 200 dpi was not as smooth as the (max) 300 dpi offered by high-end laser printers, it was generally superior to dot matrix.

WinFax PRO 3.0 was launched in November 1993 for Windows 3.x machines. This was followed by a version for Macintosh systems. This version of this product saw long life as a "non-PRO" version that was bundled with various fax modems by the end of its product cycle.

The release of WinFax PRO 4.0 in March 1994 brought together a number of key features and technologies. It introduced an improved OCR engine, introduced improvements aimed specifically at mobile fax users, better on-screen fax viewing capabilities and a focus on consistency and usability of the interface. It also included for the first time the ability to integrate directly with popular new email products such as cc:Mail and Microsoft Mail. It was soon followed by a networked version of the same product, which allowed a number of users to share a single fax modem on a networked system. This version of the product was also bundled with a grayscale scanner manufactured by Fujitsu, and sold as WinFax Scanner.

In 1994 the firm acquired AudioFile, a company that specialized in computer-based voice technology. The company created a product called TalkWorks, which enabled users to use certain fax/modems as a voice mail client. This program would later be bundled with subsequent versions of WinFax and the CommSuite 95 product.

== Fate ==
In January 1995 The New York Times called WinFax "the leader in fax software with two-thirds of the market." By mid-1995, "more than 10 million copies of WinFax" were sold (worldwide).

The final Delrina-made version of WinFax was WinFax PRO 7.0, which shipped in November 1995. There was no intervening version 5.0 or 6.0, and the jump to version 7.0 was purely a marketing decision, based on keeping up with Microsoft's suite of Office products which were then at the same number. It was the first Delrina product designed to work with the Windows 95 operating system, and was a full 32-bit application, setting it apart from its competition at the time.

By the time WinFax PRO 7.0 was being sold from retail shelves, Delrina had been acquired by Symantec in 1995. Symantec continued to market, develop and release four additional major versions of the WinFax PRO software product under the Symantec WinFax PRO banner.

WinFax PRO 10, released in February 2000, was the last major version of WinFax PRO to be developed. In 1999, John W. Thompson, a former IBM executive in sales, marketing and development, replaced Gordon Eubanks as Symantec's CEO. Thompson decided to focus on one technology category: security. Symantec's business model changed from the retail channel software company, to an enterprise security software based company with a retail channel. In a Black Enterprise September 2004 article, Thompson is quoted "We (Symantec) had Java development tools, we had personal contact management systems. We had a whole range of things that didn't relate to anything in common, except they could be moved through the same distribution channel. And my answer is: Who cares about that?".

By the end of 2001, the remaining WinFax PRO developers and support personnel were terminated from their positions. Technical support for WinFax PRO from 2002 through 2006 was outsourced to third-party call centers based out of Oregon, Texas and later India. Symantec discontinued sales and support of WinFax PRO on June 30, 2006. A web based community support forum exists for users of WinFax PRO.

== Version history ==
- WinFax 1.0 — 1990 (Windows 3.x)
- Delrina WinFax PRO 2.0 — 1991 (Windows 3.x)
- DosFax — 1992 (DOS)
- Delrina WinFax PRO 3.0 — November 1992 (Windows 3.x)
- Delrina WinFax PRO for Networks 3.0 - (Windows 3.x, Windows for Workgroups 3.1x)
- Delrina Fax PRO – 1993 (Macintosh)
- Delrina WinFax PRO 4.0 — March 1994 (Windows 3.x, later revisions supported Windows 95)
- Delrina WinFax PRO for Networks 4.0 - (Windows 3.x, Windows for Workgroups 3.1x)
- Delrina WinFax PRO for Networks 4.1 - (Windows 3.x, Windows for Workgroups 3.1x, Windows 95)
- Delrina WinFax Scanner — 1994 (Windows 95)
- Delrina WinFax PRO 7.0 — November 1995 (Windows 95)
- WinFax PRO 7.5 (bundled with TalkWorks) — October 1996 (Windows 95)
- WinFax PRO 8.0 (bundled with TalkWorks PRO) — March 1997 (Windows 95, Windows NT)
- WinFax PRO for Networks 5.0 Server — July 1997 (Windows 3.x, Windows for Workgroups 3.1x, Windows 95)
- TalkWorks PRO 2.0 — August 1998 (Windows 95, Windows NT)
- WinFax PRO 9.0 — August 1998 (Windows 9x, Windows NT/2000/XP)
- TalkWorks PRO 3.0 — August 1999 (Windows 9x, Windows NT/2000/XP)
- WinFax PRO 10.0 — February 2000 (Windows 9x, Windows NT/2000/XP)
- WinFax PRO 10.01 — January 2001 (Windows 9x, Windows Me, Windows NT/2000/XP)
- WinFax PRO 10.02 — August 2001 (Windows 9x, Windows Me, Windows NT/2000/XP)
- WinFax PRO 10.03 — November 2002 (Windows 9x, Windows Me, Windows NT/2000/XP)
- WinFax PRO 10.04 — January 2005 (update patch only from version 10.03)

== French WinFax, FaxTools elsewhere ==
BVRP (Bruno Vanryb and Roger Politis), a French startup, partnered with Hayes Microcomputer Products, and used their boosted sales of their "database program called Directory" to "change to software that runs facsimile machines" since they were concerned that they "would be crushed" in the database market. In France they chose to use the name WinFax, whereas elsewhere their product is sold as "FaxTools".
