= Rubrik =

American cloud data management company

Rubrik, Inc.
- Formerly: ScaleData, Inc.
- Type: Public
- Traded as: NYSE: RBRK (Class A); Russell 1000 component
- ISIN: US7811541090
- Industry: Cyber Security and Data Security
- Founded: January 2014; 12 years ago
- Founders: Bipul Sinha,Arvind Jain, Soham Mazumdar, Arvind Nithrakashyap
- Headquarters: Palo Alto, California, U.S.
- Key people: Bipul Sinha (CEO)
- Products: Cloud management; Backup; Business continuity planning
- Revenue: ▲US$628 million (2023)
- Net income: ▼US$−354 million (2023)
- Owners: Lightspeed Venture Partners (24%); Greylock Partners (12%); Bipul Sinha (7.6%); Arvind Jain (7%); Arvind Nithrakashyap (6.7%)
- Number of employees: 3,100 (2024)
- Website: rubrik.com

Rubrik, Inc. is an American cloud data management and data security company based in Palo Alto, California, founded in January 2014. The company is listed on the New York Stock Exchange after going public in April 2024.

== History ==
The company was founded in January 2014 by Bipul Sinha, Arvind Jain, Soham Mazumdar, and Arvind Nithrakashyap.

Institutional Venture Partners (IVP) led a US$180 million Series D funding round in May 2017, at a US$1.3 billion valuation, bringing the company to at least US$292 million raised to date.

In early 2018, Rubrik purchased Datos.io, another cloud data management company.

In January 2019, the startup has raised $261 million, which helped it to reach $3.3 billion total valuation. The core investors were Bain Capital Ventures together with Lightspeed Venture Partners, Greylock Partners, Khosla Ventures and IVP.

In December 2020, the company purchased the assets and intellectual property of Igneous, a Seattle-based company that had recently gone through a mass layoff. Until shortly before the acquisition, Igneous was led by co-founder Kiran Bhageshpur.

In August 2023, it was announced Rubrik had acquired the Israel-headquartered cloud data security company, Laminar Security for 200 million dollars,

On April 25, 2024, Rubrik began trading on the New York Stock Exchange under the ticker symbol RBRK. The company had priced its initial public offering at $32 per share, above its initial target range, raising $752 million at a $5.6 billion valuation. Shares rose 16% on the first day of trading.

== Products ==
The company calls itself a "Zero Trust Data Security." It provides data management services such as the backup and recovery, targeting enterprises that run hybrid cloud environments. Its software can be run on-premises and in the cloud to protect and manage data.

Third-party sources have cited the rise of ransomware and other corporate threats as increasing the total market demand for off-site backup solutions.

== Controversies ==
In March 2018, Dell EMC sued two former employees that currently work for Rubrik, alleging that the employees downloaded Dell EMC trade secrets, solicited former Dell EMC customers, and provided unfair competitive advantages to Rubrik.

== Personnel ==
Founder Bipul Sinha is CEO after stepping down from his role at Lightspeed. He holds several patents for distributed storage technologies. He has publicly described inviting all to board meetings as an act of “radical transparency.”

Former Microsoft Chairman John W. Thompson is a board member. Basketball player Kevin Durant is a notable investor, citing Rubrik as his first technology investment made with the guidance of noted angel investor Ron Conway.
