= Cyberjack =

Web browser computer software

Cyberjack was a Web browser application created by Delrina in 1995. It was sold as a stand-alone product, and was also bundled as part of Delrina's CommSuite 95 offering.

In addition to the Web browser application, it also included an ftp client, Usenet newsgroup reader, an IRC client, a graphic interface to gopher services and more. It used a Wizard-based front-end that provided access to all of these services. It was touted as being the first 32-bit based Web browsing program, and was aimed squarely at Windows 95 users. It could transform seamlessly from one application to another as required, a feature that would not be emulated until later browsers of the late 1990s.

As an application it had two main drawbacks: its browser application was incapable of rendering tables, which were then becoming predominant in Web site design, and it also lacked an email client. While table support was added more than a year later, by that time it had lost important mindshare.

In the end, it could not compete against other browser offerings that were offered for free, such as the contemporaneous Internet Explorer 2, which came out November 1995 and Netscape Navigator.

Although marketed by Symantec, the Cyberjack suite was written by a small South African startup, Vironix Software Laboratories. Vironix was owned by Dave and Paula Hall and originally operated from Westville, near Durban. During the development of Cyberjack, the majority of the programmers moved to a new office in Muizenberg, a beach town near Cape Town. The entire programming team consisted of only about six developers, roughly one per Internet application. The suite was sold to Delrina, which was later bought by Symantec. However, it came to market at about the time that the Internet Explorer/Netscape Navigator browser war was developing, and the small programming team with limited resources could not keep up with the pace of browser development. After Cyberjack was discontinued by Symantec, Vironix went into liquidation although some of the members of the Cyberjack team went on to develop the WebFerret application.

== See also ==
- Internet Suite
- List of mergers and acquisitions by Symantec
