= Rowland Hanson =

Rowland Hanson, (born 1952) is the current Chairman of CRH & Associates, and the CEO of the HMC Company. He is known for his work in Microsoft, where he convinced the company to name their new graphical user interface (GUI) "Windows" over the original proposal, "Interface Manager."

== Education ==
Hanson received a BBA from Loyola Marymount University and an MBA from the Wharton School of Business at the University of Pennsylvania, where he graduated on the Directors List of Distinction.

== Work history ==
Hanson served as the Vice President of Worldwide Marketing for the Neutrogena Corporation, acquired by Johnson & Johnson for a “significant premium.” Johnson & Johnson’s acquisition of Neutrogena – which was largely for the brand’s strength – caught the attention of Microsoft founder Bill Gates and CEO Steve Ballmer, who convinced Hanson to join them in over branding efforts of what eventually became known as Windows.

Hanson served as a branding consultant for companies like Monsanto, IBM and Nautilus, which created BowFlex.

Hanson now serves as the GM of Strategic Partnering for the Microsoft Alumni Foundation – the complementary organization to the Gates Foundation, which focuses on enhancing global healthcare and reducing extreme poverty, and in the U.S., to expand education and access to information technology.

== Related pages ==
- History of Microsoft Windows
- Windows 9x
- Delrina
