= Bert Amato =

Canadian businessman

Bert Amato is an investor and consultant in the high-technology industry. He currently sits as an advisory board member of several firms, including XDL Intervest Management, Farelogix and Infotriever.

Born in Rhodesia, he emigrated to Canada, where he received a degree in industrial engineering from the University of Toronto. He helped co-found Delrina in 1988 along with South African expatriates Mark Skapinker and Dennis Bennie. The previous year, he and Skapinker came up with the idea of creating electronic business form software. They met with Bennie, who was then the chief executive officer of Carolian Systems International, a firm that made business software for Hewlett-Packard. He arranged for an initial seed investment of $1.5 million CAD to create a new start-up company to develop this idea, which was called "Delrina".

From 1988 to 1995 he was executive vice president and chief technical officer of Delrina, where he was responsible for product research. He helped to orchestrate the sale of the firm to Symantec in November 1995, and for one year served as a vice president on that firm's board.
