= Echo Lake (software) =

Multimedia software product by Delrina

- Developers: Delrina; Creative Wonders
- Initial release: June 23, 1995; 30 years ago October 29, 1996; 29 years ago
- Platform: Windows; Macintosh
- Type: Multimedia

Echo Lake (AKA Family Album Creator) was the most notable multimedia software product produced by Delrina, which debuted in June 1995. It was touted internally as a "cross [of] Quark Xpress and Myst". It featured an immersive 3D environment where a user could go to a virtual desktop in a virtual office and assemble video and audio clips along with images, and then print them out as either a virtual book other users of the program could use, or for print. It was a highly innovative product for its time, and ultimately was hampered by the inability of many users able to input their own multimedia content easily into a computer from that period.

Creative Wonders bought the rights to the Echo Lake multimedia product, which was re-shaped as an introductory program on multimedia and re-released as Family Album Creator in 1996.
