= AudioFile (company) =

AudioFile was a software company that was founded in Massachusetts in 1990. It was founded under Venture Capital Investment by the Massachusetts Technology Development Corporation.

Their early product was AudioFile Business Audio, a suite of applications that included AudioRecorder, a program to embed audio into email and documents, and AudioEditor, a program to edit audio and apply various effects to the audio. The software included Audio timescale-pitch modification, the ability to change the speed of audio without changing the pitch, and a codec to compress audio to approximately 36 times smaller than uncompressed audio to save disk space and reduce bandwidth when sending via email. AudioFile Business Audio evolved into TalkWorks, a program designed to allow computers equipped with an appropriate fax-modem to act as a software-based telephone answering machine, for receiving voice mail as well as faxes, and a virtual telephone/speaker phone with speed dial and other buttons.

AudioFile was bought by Delrina in October 1994, and its technology was bundled into WinFax as part of CommSuite 95. Delrina was subsequently bought out in 1995 by Symantec, and continued its development. Its voice mail capabilities were options available to WinFax PRO 7.0, 7.5 and 8.0. Symantec later sold TalkWorks as separate products named TalkWorks PRO 2.0 (August 1998) and TalkWorks PRO 3.0 (August 1999). The last version of WinFax, version 10, did not include any TalkWorks functionality.
