= Brightmail =

Former American technology company

Brightmail Inc.
- Type: Private
- Industry: Tech industry
- Founded: 1998
- Founder: Sunil Paul
- Defunct: 2004
- Fate: Acquired by Symantec
- Headquarters: San Francisco
- Products: Email filtering software
- Revenue: $26 million (2003)
- Net income: $1.1 million (2003)
- Number of employees: 127 (2004)
- Website: Official website

Brightmail Inc. was a San Francisco–based technology company focused on anti-spam filtering. Brightmail's system has a three-pronged approach to stopping spam, the Probe Network is a massive number of e-mail addresses established for the sole purpose of receiving spam. The Brightmail Logistics and Operations Center (BLOC) evaluates newly detected spam and issues rules for ISPs. The third approach is the Spam Wall, a filtering engine that identifies and screens out spam based on the updates from the BLOC.

Brightmail had partnerships with major Email providers and ISPs including Netscape, Sendmail, Hotmail and Software.com. Other partners include AT&T WorldNet Service, Concentric Network, EarthLink, Excite, FastNet, FlashNet, Juno Online Services and USA.net.

The antivirus-inspired regular update mechanism used to detect spam email attracted the attention of Internet security software makers and Brightmail was acquired by Symantec in 2004.

The Brightmail name continued to be used by Symantec, and the slogan Powered by Brightmail appeared on their products until 2011 when most products were renamed or deprecated into what is known as Symantec Messaging Gateway (SMG).

== Background ==
Founded as Bright Light Technologies, Inc. by a group of AOL expatriates led by Sunil Paul in 1998, with the promise to “end spam,” Bright Light raised $55 million in three rounds of venture capital led by Accel, TCV, and Symantec. After the second round of funding, Bright Light changed its name to Brightmail in summer 1999.
Brightmail's services were mostly geared toward ISPs, whose subscribers were demanding a solution to spam or junk email, as it is estimated that fifty percent of all email is unwanted spam.

Brightmail made its name by creating a server-side spam filtering and customized software update services that employed sophisticated server-based rules that recognize spam and restrict the ability of spammers to relay mail through other people's servers. From a network of partners Brightmail gets an early warning of any widespread spam, which it analyzes in real-time at the Brightmail Logistics and Operations Center.

== Symantec acquisition ==
In mid-2004, Symantec Corp., an early investor that owned 11 percent of Brightmail, acquired the firm for $370 million in an all-cash deal. Symantec was expanding beyond antivirus to provide a variety of security software, services and hardware. To this end, it has made a number of acquisitions between 2002 and 2004, including SafeWeb and On Technology. Brightmail technology was incorporated in most Symantec's products, including the well-known Norton antivirus product line. The move marks Brightmail's shift from point antispam systems to the larger, more integrated email security solutions, including products that solve a wide range of email messaging problems.

The CEO at the time of acquisition was Enrique Salem, who later went on to become the CEO of Symantec before being ousted in 2012.

== Products and services ==
- Brightmail Anti-Spam: used to identify and filter unsolicited or unwanted electronic messages.
- Brightmail Anti-Virus: an anti-virus module, is used to scan message attachments for viruses and other malicious code, and deliver anti-virus signature updates to customers automatically and securely.
- Brightmail Reputation Service
- Brightmail Anti-Fraud
