= Fastrac =

Fastrac may refer to

- JCB Fastrac, a tractor by J. C. Bamford
- Fastrac rocket engine, NASA's (cancelled) project
- Fastrac (software), VTLS software
- Formation Autonomy Spacecraft with Thrust, Relnav, Attitude, and Crosslink, A University of Texas satellite

== See also ==
- Fast Track (disambiguation)
- Fastrack (disambiguation)
