= Company85 =

British company

- Company type: IT Consultancy
- Headquarters: City of London, United Kingdom
- Parent: Telstra
- Website: www.company85.com

Company85 is a subsidiary of Telstra and performs IT consultancy in IT transformation, service management, workspace, cloud integration, data management, and security and privacy. It was formed in 2010 following a management buyout from Symantec. Company85 is based in the City of London, UK.

== History ==
Company85 was originally established as Company-i, a professional IT services firm based in the City of London, United Kingdom. In 2006 Company-i was acquired by Symantec and became the UK and EMEA consulting arm of Symantec Global Services. The acquisition was driven by Symantec’s wish to deepen its risk management services capability.

Following Symantec’s decision in 2010 to move to a channel-based consultancy delivery model, the business again became independently owned and managed, with Adrian Spink as CEO, Stephen Watterson as services director and Bill Trim as sales director. All three had been with the company since its time as Company-i.

In 2017, Telstra acquired Company85 saying that, "the acquisition was aligned to Telstra’s strategy to grow its technology services business internationally and would significantly enhance Telstra’s service offering for UK and European based business and government customers."

== Services ==
Company85 provides advisory, programme management and managed services in cyber security, storage, backup, and data centre transformation. It was Symantec's first Data Protection Delivery Provider to be appointed in the UK. and has since expanded its technology alliances with EMC, HDS, Proofpoint and others.

== Acquisition of XOR ==
On 2 August 2013 Company85 acquired XOR, a provider of specialist consultancy, integration and support services to the UK IT channel. XOR had been a specialist supplier of workspace transformation services that had been named one of the UK's fastest-growing tech firms in 2012.

== See also ==
- Company-i
