= CommSuite 95 =

Communications software suite

CommSuite 95 is a communications software suite launched in 1995 by Canadian software company Delrina.

== History ==
Beta testing started in August 1995. CommSuite 95 was a collection of 32-bit programs created specifically for use with Windows 95. It included WinFax PRO 7.0 (computer fax software), along with WinComm PRO 7.0 (online communications), TalkWorks (a voice mail application), and the Cyberjack suite of Internet components. A beta of Cyberjack 7.0 web browser was available early October 1995 for a free trial download.

It was the last official release issued under the Delrina brand. The company was bought out by Symantec the month before the suite's release in November 1995.

== Features ==
CommSuite offered features such as 32-bit components compatible with Windows 95 and MS Office, support for OLE 2.0, messaging API and Telephony Application Programming Interface. WinComm Pro provided virus protection. CommBar module offered status reporting and easy access to all components.

== Reception ==
The software was well received, with PC/Computing preview highlighting CommSuite 95 as the first package to integrate fax, e-mail, voice mail and web browsing seamlessly under Windows 95. However, some deficiencies were noted. A PC Magazine "first look article reported performance problems on systems with less than 16 MB RAM and issues with Cyberjack, which was displayed many pages incorrectly. InfoWorld review lauded features like 32 bit access, multitasking, multithreading and OLE 2.0 support, but criticized high disk space requirements and installation problems; (the reviewer was forced to install applications separately). The target market was thought to be unclear, as many people would likely be content with Windows services.
