= JetForm =

Canadian software manufacturer

JetForm Corporation
- Formerly: Indigo Software
- Type: Public
- Traded as: Nasdaq: FORMF; TSX: JFM; PCX: JTF
- Industry: Software
- Founded: 1982
- Founders: Wayne Hall; Bob Allum; Tom Hicks; John Gleed; Ed Deinstadt
- Defunct: September 13, 2001
- Fate: Renamed Accelio; acquired by Adobe Systems in February 2002
- Successor: Accelio
- Headquarters: Ottawa, Ontario, Canada
- Area served: Worldwide
- Products: JetForm Design; JetForm Filler; FormFlow

JetForm Corporation was the name of a Canadian software manufacturer created by five consultants (Wayne Hall, Bob Allum, Tom Hicks, John Gleed and Ed Deinstadt) that was based out of Ottawa, Ontario, Canada and an electronic form software product of the same name.

JetForm once had major offices in the United States, various countries in Europe, Australia, and New Zealand. It was founded in 1982, and was listed under NASDAQ as FORMF, under the Pacific Stock Exchange as JTF, and the Toronto Stock Exchange as JFM.

== History ==
The company was originally named Indigo Software and was solely a software consulting firm. Indigo Software did work for the Canadian Federal Government and IBM (as the maintainer of an IBM CAD software product); among other clients. One significant government project resulted in an electronic forms product being created: iFiller, iPrint, et al.

With Microsoft's release of Windows 3.11, Indigo Software did a major enhancement to the forms software and re-branded it JetForm. The JetForm forms product was very successful, and Indigo Software's consulting work also began to focus on work associated with the JetForm software. Given the popularity of the forms software, Indigo Software made a decision to rename the company JetForm.

Its eponymous series of products directly competed against other electronic forms software, such as Delrina's PerForm, and FormFlow products.

In September, 1996, Symantec, which had bought Delrina the previous year, sold their Electronic Forms Division to JetForm. JetForm continued to develop the FormFlow series of products under its own name.

Around this time, JetForm bought the naming rights to the Ottawa Baseball Stadium, naming it "JetForm Park".

On September 13, 2001, JetForm changed its name to Accelio. Accelio was acquired by Adobe Systems in February 2002. The electronic forms products were officially retired in 2004. Adobe marketed JetForm as Adobe Central Output Server , without any major changes. Adobe's successor for the JetForm technology was released June 7, 2007, as Adobe LiveCycle Enterprise Suite (ES), part of the Adobe LiveCycle suite. The product was renamed again on April 9, 2009 to Adobe Central / Central Pro Output Server and reached its end of Extended Support on June 30, 2016.

== JetForm Software ==
JetForm Design allowed for routing and tracking in workflow systems, on-screen form creation, and access to SQL and ODBC-compliant databases. JetForm Filler was used for completing on-screen forms. JetForm also developed the XML form format "XFA", which was later adopted by Adobe into its PDF software.

One of the Indigo Forms software's innovations when it was introduced was its ability to have its forms installed into Laserjet font cartridges. This meant that the product only had to send forms data to the printer; since the form was already encoded in the font cartridge. Given the slow printer interfaces used at that time, this greatly reduced print times.
