= LIRIC Associates =

Computer security consultancy

- Type: Subsidiary of Symantec
- Industry: Computers
- Founded: United Kingdom
- Headquarters: United Kingdom
- Parent: Symantec

LIRIC Associates was a computer security consultancy in the United Kingdom that offered risk and security assessment for global networks. It also provided advice on the design, architecture and policies required to secure complex global networks. The company was a provider of Information Technology, IT Security and Telecommunications. Its clients included UK government departments and private sector organizations.

It was acquired by Symantec on September 17, 2004.
