= Javelin Networks =

Cyber security software

- Industry: Cyber Security; Computer Software
- Founded: May 1, 2014; 11 years ago in Tel Aviv, Israel
- Founders: Roi Abutbul; Guy Franco; Almog Ohayon
- Products: AD-Protect; AD-Assess
- Website: www.javelin-networks.com

Javelin Networks is an Israeli Artificial Intelligence (AI) and cyber security software development organization. The organization develops A.I., obfuscation and advanced forensics methodologies, and has branches in Tel Aviv and Palo Alto (California).

== History ==
Javelin was founded in 2014 by Roi Abutbul, Guy Franco and Almog Ohayon.

In 2016, Javelin Network was recognized by Gartner as a “Cool Vendor”, and was named a Grand Trophy and Gold Award Winner for the 2017 Info Security Product Guide Excellence Awards. The company also received the 2017 Cybersecurity Excellence Award for Most Innovative Cybersecurity Company and the Gold in the Golden Bridge Award for Endpoint Security Solution Innovations
