= PeopleCube =

PeopleCube is the producer of Resource Scheduler, Meeting Maker and several other software applications for group calendaring and resource scheduling. The company's headquarters are located in Framingham, Massachusetts, with satellite offices in Grand Rapids, Michigan, Traverse City, Michigan, Tucson, Arizona, and Twickenham, London, UK.

PeopleCube was acquired by Meeting Maker, Inc. on November 14, 2005, which assumed their company name. Formerly, Meeting Maker, Inc. was spun off from ON Technology Corp., which sold the Meeting Maker product line to them in 2000. ON Technology was later purchased by Symantec Corp. in 2003.

Asure Software acquired PeopleCube in 2012.
