= Dennis Bennie =

American venture capitalist

- Born: Dennis Bennie
- Education: University of the Witwatersrand

Dennis Bennie is an entrepreneur and early-stage investor based in Toronto, Canada. He co-founded Mission Electronics in 1979; co-founded Aviva Software in 1982; co-founded Delrina in 1988; raised two venture funds under XDL Group and is currently a mentor, advisor and angel investor to early-stage technology companies.

== Career ==
Bennie qualified as a chartered accountant in 1975. He entered the world of technology in 1979, when he co-founded Mission Electronics, a high-end home entertainment equipment producer. In 1982, he sold his interest in Mission and co-founded Aviva Software, a PC software developer. The company expanded to include software distribution and in 1986 merged with Ingram Micro to become Canada's largest software distributor.

From 1988 to 1996, Bennie was co-founder, chairman and CEO of Delrina Corporation, which forged new software strategies and was best known for producing WinFax. Listed on both the Toronto Stock Exchange and NASDAQ, Delrina was sold to Symantec in 1995 for share consideration valued at $760 million.

In 1996, he founded the first XDL Venture Fund, focusing on early-stage technology opportunities. The XDL funds raised a total of $185 million venture capital and are fully invested. Bennie currently manages the XDL Capital Group, investing at the venture and angel levels.

=== Venture Investments ===
Current active venture investments include Figment.io, Q4 Inc., Newtopia and LumiQ

=== Angel Investments ===
Current active angel investments include Sheertex, JoyRide, Thalmic Labs Inc., Nuco, Platterz, Vouchr, Tulip Retail, Nymi Inc., Linkett, Validere Technologies, Interaptix Inc, Edsby, Mimosa Diagnostics Inc., and Xanadu.

=== Creative Destruction Lab ===
Bennie is one of the co-founders of the Creative Destruction Lab at the Rotman School of Management. The Creative Destruction Lab is a seed-stage program focusing on the transition stage from pre-seed to seed-stage funding.

== Investment Exits ==
- Appinions Inc., acquired
- Backweb Technologies Inc., IPO
- Commtouch (now Cyren), IPO
- Delano Technology Corp., IPO
- Entercept Security Technologies, acquired
- Firmex, acquired
- Lanacom Inc., acquired
- Lorex Technology (now Lorex by FLIR), acquired
- MGI Software, acquired
- Mill Street Brewery, acquired
- Netect, Ltd., acquired
- Reimage Inc., acquired
- Semagix, Inc., acquired
- Tucows, IPO
- Quandl, acquired
