= FastTrack Schedule =

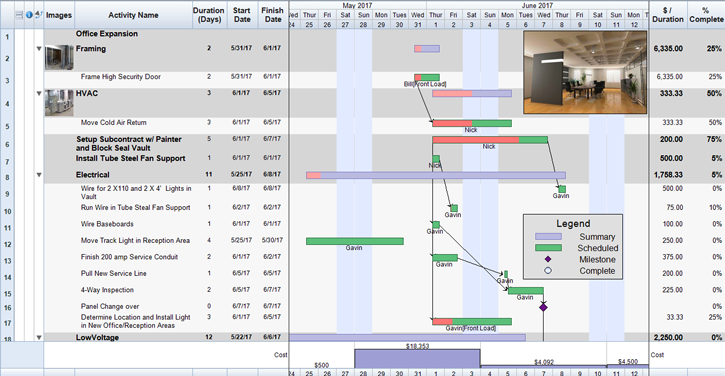
- Developers: AEC Software, Inc.
- Release: 1987
- Stable release: FastTrack Schedule 2026 v12.0.6 Build 3008
- Operating system: Microsoft Windows, macOS
- Type: Project management software
- License: Proprietary
- Website: www.aecsoftware.com

FastTrack Schedule is a Project Management Software app (PMS) for Mac and Windows. It helps teams plan, track, analyze, organize, manage resources, develop resource estimates, and report their projects. It can manage planning, scheduling, cost control, budget management, resource allocation, and Project Portfolio Management (PPM).

It was first released in 1987 for Microsoft Windows and macOS, and is used for planning, tracking, and reporting project goals.

It also supports cross-platform compatibility between Mac and Windows users of FastTrack Schedule. FastTrack Schedule is fully cross-platform compatible, so Windows, Mac, and mixed-platform teams can all use the software collaboratively. The program is available as a local installation or a "floating license" for larger teams with an online license management portal to administer larger teams and license configurations.

It is designed to run on the latest operating systems, such as macOS 27 Golden Gate, macOS 26 Tahoe, macOS 15 Sequoia, macOS 14 Sonoma, macOS 13 Ventura, macOS 12 Monterey, Mac OS Big Sur, macOS Catalina, macOS Mojave, Windows 11, Windows 11 ARM64 and Windows 10. Fully native on Intel and Apple silicone M1, M2, M3, M4, M5 and M6 processor Macs.

Available in English, French, Spanish, and German.

The developer, AEC Software, Inc., is headquartered in the Dulles Technology Corridor of Northern Virginia.

== Overview ==
FastTrack Schedule allows users to organize tasks into project plans, assign resources to tasks, use effort driven scheduling, and view project details in many forms, such as spread sheets, Gantt charts, monthly calendars, and resource histograms. Available in English, French, German, and Spanish language versions.

Both Mac and Windows versions have been fully rebuilt as 64 bit applications.

Online license management portal to administer larger teams and license configurations

License Activation for enhanced purchase security.

It includes a range of intuitive graphical tools to help effectively plan and manage Gantt chart schedules, and track project resources. Over two hundred fifty (250) unique, colorful bar styles are included, or one can create their own.

Included are over fifty (50) free Project Management Templates and Project Management Example files.

The app's capabilities are also suited for 'accidental' project managers as well as experienced project managers working in small to mid-sized project teams. Versions are available for Microsoft Windows and macOS and files are cross-platform compatible, enabling team members on PCs and Macs to collaborate on projects. Also, available are Floating License versions for installation on a file share or server.

FastTrack Schedule also exchanges data with spreadsheets such as Microsoft Excel, databases, organizers such as Microsoft Outlook, Google Calendar, and Apple Calendar, and other project management software, including Microsoft Project.

It has a global customer base and has been localized into four languages (English, French, Spanish, and German). Some of their well-known users include: NASA, Nike, Amazon.com, Honda, Pixar, MIT Lincoln Laboratory, and The Olympic Games.

In 2012, FastTrack Schedule Go for the iPad was released. A productivity app sold on Apple iTunes, it allowed the user to analyze, present, and take their schedule with them. It worked with FastTrack Schedule Mac/Win files, XML, and Microsoft Project files. FastTrack Schedule Go is no longer distributed.

== Features ==
FastTrack Schedule 2026 files are cross-platform between Windows and Mac. Schedules can easily be passed back and forth between Mac and Windows users of FastTrack Schedule 2026.

License Activation Management:

- License Activation for enhanced security of purchased licenses.
- Online license management portal to administer larger teams and license configurations

macOS unique features:

- Designed for macOS 27 Golden Gate, macOS 26 Tahoe, macOS 15 Sequoia, and macOS 14 Sonoma.
- FastTrack Schedule 2026 for Mac is a 64-bit app
- FastTrack Schedule 2026 for Mac the Universal Binary runs natively on Intel processor Macs, and it runs natively on all new Apple silicone M1, M2, M3, M4, M5, and M6 processor Macs.
- Full Retina Display Resolution support, including support for mixed Retina and Non-Retina displays
- support for iCloud, Finder Tags, and Dark Mode
- Apple document management and revision history

Windows unique features:

- Designed to run on Windows 11, Windows 11 ARM64, (and Windows 10)
- Windows HD Color. High DPI - HDR resolution support for a sharper appearance on all of one's monitors, including mixed standard and High DPI displays
- Support for (4) color themes, including Black - for use with Dark Mode.
- Built-in PDF export support

New features for both Mac and Windows versions: One-Click Reports feature - Create, Customize, Name, and Save comprehensive Reports.

  - Mac and Windows versions fully rebuilt as 64 bit applications
  - Unlimited Undo and Redo functionality - 30+ levels of Undo/Redo
  - On-Screen Zoom Feature - Zoom in or out on any part of the project one chooses or adjust the zoom for the best on-screen experience for their monitor
  - Automatic Print-to-One-Page feature
  - Highlight Filters – Highlight filtered rows in any color and display them in context with the overall schedule
  - Dynamic Filters - Dynamically generated filters for Resources
  - Color Calendars feature – Highlight Important Project Dates, holidays, or other periods that impact the project in the Schedule, Calendar, and Resource Views. Import .ics files into Color Calendars to utilize calendars created in other apps
  - Resource cost and work details per Assignment
  - Duration Units columns - select any Source column and convert that value into other duration units, all without needing to set up a sophisticated formula in a Calculation column, and... the values are bi-directional
  - put pictures, text boxes, and legends in Calendar View Print Preview to customize and enhance one's Calendars
  - user interface (UI) designed to be cleaner and smoother
  - Enhanced Progress Tracking
  - Viewing of Bar Components in four different configurations: Only Scheduled, only Baseline, Scheduled + Baseline, or Scheduled + Baseline if Different
  - Emoji support
  - A suite of over 50 Built-in Bar and Milestone styles, and improved Bar and Milestone customization
  - Numerous Bar and Milestone refinements for optimal integration with MS Project and other project management tools
  - Custom Naming of Bar and Milestone styles for increased organization and efficiency
  - Automatic switching between Bars and Milestones
  - Multiple Baselines scheduling
  - Improved Critical Path scheduling and management
  - Critical Path now automatically changes the bar color to red or any other color one chooses
  - MS Project 2019 and 2021 file import - Support for opening files with Manually Scheduled tasks
  - Java is no longer required to open MS Project files
  - New feature to change the Font Family and Font Face in an existing file.
  - improved compatibility of files saved cross-platform Mac to Windows, and Windows to Mac
  - Web-based Help system
  - Unlimited Layouts and Filters
  - A new, curved Link style for attractive timeline reports
  - Theme-driven appearance and drawing
  - Redesigned and modern Gantt Chart appearance

Intuitive Interface

The Mac product has a Format Bar that is familiar to Mac uses, while the Windows product uses the Ribbon. The Format Bar and Ribbon are both context-sensitive and contain key scheduling tools. In addition, they can be customized by dragging and dropping features one uses the most.

Base and Work Calendars

Choose built-in Base Calendars such as standard, 24 hour, night shift, 7 Day, 6 Day, 4 Day, 2 Day (weekend) calendars, or customize your own. These work calendars can be assigned per-task, so projects can have an unlimited number of Work Calendars.

Effort-Driven Scheduling

For tasks that can be completed faster by adding more resources, use Effort-Driven Scheduling for simple schedule compression. Automatically adjust task durations as resources are added or subtracted, while keeping the total work for a task constant.

Image Columns

Use Image Columns to add pictures of task items, staff, resources, designs, progress photos, etc, directly into column cells. Images automatically scale as thumbnails to match row heights and display as larger images when one hovers over them.

Assignment Contouring

Choose from eight built-in work contours or customize your own for the ultimate ease and flexibility in resource scheduling. Assignment contouring enables one to quickly re-distribute their resources' efforts on a task for those special cases and must-meet deadlines.

Work Usage Inspector

Monitor resource workloads while making assignments in the Schedule View. The Work Usage Inspector displays Resource Usage Graphs at the base of the Gantt chart to provide a detailed snapshot of a resource's free and busy time, enabling one to make precise assignments and effectively manage resource costs.

Resource Information Form

The Resource Information Form organizes work schedules, rates, and all contact information into a single comprehensive form.

Images, Text Boxes and Legends

Add textboxes, legends, graphics, photos, logos, sketches, and other images to enhance the visuals of projects.

Etc.

Resource Management: Collect, organize, and track a resource's Details, Skill Sets, Materials/Supplies, Costs, Groups, by creating from scratch or importing

Collaboration: Work with others using Team Calendars, Timeline, Issue Tracking, Email Integration, and Dashboard.

Project Management: Includes tools for Task Management, Mind Maps, Task Feedback, Scheduling, Calendars, Timelines, Gantt Charts, Interactive Gantt Charts, Reporting, Statistics, Work Load, Financials, Document Management, Privacy Settings, Budgeting, Critical Path Method, Project Templates, Baseline, Custom Baseline, Milestones.

Help & Support: A support system is provided which includes: Training Courses, FAQ's, Tutorials, User Manual, Email Support, Online Form Support, Telephone Support, and an online forum.

== See also ==
- Project management software
- Comparison of project management software
