= Riptech =

American security services company, 1998–2002

- Type: Private (1998–2002)
- Industry: Managed security services, computer security
- Founded: April 1998; 28 years ago
- Defunct: August 2002; 24 years ago
- Fate: Acquired by Symantec, 2002
- Headquarters: United States
- Parent: Symantec (2002)
- Website: www.riptech.com

Riptech was an American managed security services company founded in April 1998 by Amit Yoran, his brothers Elad and Naftali Yoran, and Tim Belcher. The company provided 24-hour monitoring of corporate networks for security threats and published research analysing trends in internet-based attacks. Symantec acquired Riptech in August 2002 for US$145 million in cash.

== History ==
Riptech was founded in April 1998 during the dot-com era. The company began operations in December 1999 and raised US$45 million in venture capital from Columbia Capital, Providence Equity and Broadview Capital. It operated a security operations centre that monitored client networks around the clock and issued threat intelligence reports documenting attack patterns across the internet.

Amit Yoran, who co-founded the company, subsequently became Director of the National Cyber Security Division at the United States Department of Homeland Security in 2003, and later became chief executive of Tenable, Inc.

Symantec completed its acquisition of Riptech in August 2002 for $145 million, integrating the company's managed security operations into Symantec's enterprise security services business.
