= PcAnywhere =

Discontinued software suite by Symantec

pcAnywhere
- Developer: Symantec Corporation
- Release: 1986 (DOS), 1993 (Windows)
- Final release: 12.6.65 / 2012
- Operating system: Windows, Mac OS, Linux
- Available in: English
- Type: Remote administration software
- License: Proprietary
- Website: Official Webpage

pcAnywhere is a discontinued suite of computer programs by Symantec which allowed a user of the pcAnywhere remote program on a computer to connect to a personal computer running the pcAnywhere host if both are connected to interconnected networks and the password is known. pcAnywhere runs on several platforms, including Microsoft Windows, Linux, Mac OS X, and Pocket PC.

== History ==
The first version of pcAnywhere 1.0 for DOS was originally developed by Dynamic Microprocessor Associates (DMA) in 1986. A few years later, in 1991, Dynamic Microprocessor Associates was acquired by Symantec and the program was renamed to Norton pcAnywhere. In March 1993, Symantec released Norton pcAnywhere 1.0 for Windows.

== Issues ==
In January 2012, Symantec, the maker of pcAnywhere, revealed a security breach and told users to stop using the software, pending a resolution of the problem and the creation of new secure code, while on February 7, 2012 the software's source code was leaked and distributed through The Pirate Bay. Symantec responded with a series of cumulative hot fixes to pcAnywhere versions 12.0.x, 12.1.x and 12.5.x. The hot fixes addressed immediate issues identified by Symantec's assessment of the code exposure. Symantec also released hot fixes for the pcAnywhere versions, 12.5.x and 12.6.x, bundled with Symantec Management Suites. A full cumulative service pack patch was released on April 11, 2012. Symantec gave out free upgrades to all customers that had a previous version of Symantec pcAnywhere dating back to the late 1990s.

In May 2014, Symantec announced the end of life for Symantec pcAnywhere, and according to its FAQ "At this time, Symantec has no plans to introduce a replacement remote control product." Symantec recommends users disable PC Anywhere, and for its standalone version Bomgar as a replacement.

== See also ==
- GoToMyPC
- Internet
- PuTTY
- Remote Desktop Connection
- TeamViewer
- TightVNC
- VNC
