= John W. Thompson =

American technology executive (born 1949)

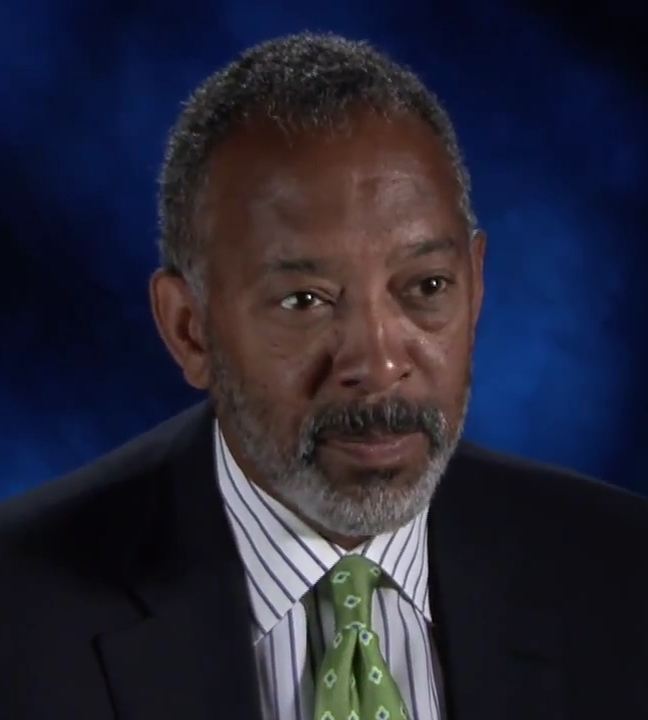
- John W. Thompson
- Born: John Wendell Thompson; April 24, 1949 (age 77); Fort Dix, New Jersey, U.S.
- Education: Florida A&M University (BBA, 1971); Massachusetts Institute of Technology (MBA, 1983)
- Occupations: Chairman, Microsoft Corporation; Chairman, Illumina
- Employer(s): IBM (1971–1999); Symantec (1999–2009); Microsoft (2014–2021); Illumina (2021–2023)

John Wendell Thompson (born April 24, 1949) is an American technology executive who was the chairman of Microsoft from 2014 until June 2021, and chairman of Illumina from 2021 until 2023. He is a former chief executive of Virtual Instruments, a vice-president at IBM and the former chief executive of Symantec. Thompson later became an independent director on the board of Microsoft, and in February 2014, was named chairman. He led the search for Microsoft's next CEO; as a result, Satya Nadella was selected.

== Personal life ==
Born at Fort Dix, New Jersey, Thompson attended John F. Kennedy High School in Riviera Beach, Florida (now Suncoast Community High School). He received a Bachelor of Business Administration from Florida A&M University in 1971 and an MBA from MIT Sloan School of Management in 1983. He has worked with Ducks Unlimited as an advocate for outdoor conservation. He is a member of Kappa Alpha Psi fraternity.

== Professional life ==
Before moving on to become Symantec's CEO in 1999, Thompson's 28-year career with IBM Corporation included senior executive positions in sales, marketing and software development, and lastly as general manager of IBM Americas as well as membership in the company’s Worldwide Management Council.

In September 2002, Thompson was appointed to the National Infrastructure Advisory Committee (NIAC) which makes recommendations regarding the security of the critical infrastructure of the United States.

Thompson purchased a 20 percent share of the Golden State Warriors NBA team in 2005 along with three other Silicon Valley businessmen under the umbrella of the Bay Area Basketball Partners, L.L.C.

In April 2006, Forbes published a list of the most highly compensated CEOs. Thompson was ranked #8 with a total compensation of US$71.84 million.

Thompson retired from his post as CEO of Symantec on April 4, 2009, turning the company's reins over to long-time Symantec executive Enrique Salem.

In 2010, Thompson was recognized for his commitment to education in Silicon Valley at the Silicon Valley Education Foundation's 2010 Pioneers & Purpose event. He received the Pioneer Business Leader award, which is awarded to individuals who have achieved outstanding accomplishments in business and education. Thompson was the CEO of the Silicon Valley–based company, Virtual Instruments, which develops applications deployed in virtualized and private cloud computing environments. The company struggled with funding and Thompson’s performance was criticized for going on furloughs during critical periods. In 2016, Thompson left the startup after its merger with Load Dynamix.

Thompson joined Microsoft’s board in 2012. On February 4, 2014, Thompson was appointed as chairman of Microsoft, succeeding Bill Gates. On the same day Nadella replaced Steve Ballmer as the Microsoft CEO. He stated that he joined the board because he had "admired Microsoft for many, many, many years". Thompson said he considered Microsoft to be "one of the true, iconic companies in our country".

=== Past and current board memberships ===
- Microsoft
- Illumina
- Illinois Governor's Human Resource Advisory Council
- Teach For America
- Illumio
- Liquid Robotics
- Rubrik
- Seismic Software
- Inxeption

== Political activity ==
Thompson was a supporter of Barack Obama's campaign during the 2008 election cycle. In January 2009, news sources reported that President-elect Obama was considering Thompson to fill the Secretary of Commerce post in the Obama administration. Ultimately, Senator Judd Gregg was chosen for the post but withdrew his name on February 12. Thompson again remained a potential candidate until the successful appointment of Gary Locke.

Speaker of the House Nancy Pelosi appointed Thompson to the Financial Crisis Inquiry Commission in 2009.

Preceded by Bill Gates	Chairman of Microsoft; 2014–2021	Succeeded by Satya Nadella
