= Revivio =

American data protection company, 2001–2006

Revivio, Inc.
- Type: Private (2001–2006)
- Industry: Continuous data protection, storage software
- Founded: 2001; 25 years ago in Lexington, Massachusetts, United States
- Founder: Michael Rowan; Kevin Rodgers
- Defunct: 2006
- Fate: Acquired by Symantec, 2006
- Headquarters: Lexington, Massachusetts, United States
- Parent: Symantec (2006)

Revivio, Inc. was an American continuous data protection (CDP) company headquartered in Lexington, Massachusetts, founded in 2001 by Michael Rowan and Kevin Rodgers. The company developed storage software that continuously captured changes to data, allowing administrators to restore systems to any point in time rather than only to scheduled backup snapshots. Symantec acquired Revivio on 7 December 2006 for US$20 million, a figure that represented a significant loss relative to the approximately $55 million that had been invested in the company.

== History ==
Revivio was founded in 2001 to develop continuous data protection technology, which differed from traditional backup software by recording every write operation to storage rather than taking periodic snapshots. This approach enabled fine-grained recovery to any earlier point in time, reducing potential data loss in the event of corruption, accidental deletion or system failure.

Despite raising approximately $55 million in venture funding, the company struggled to achieve scale in a competitive enterprise storage market. Symantec announced its intention to acquire Revivio in November 2006 and completed the transaction on 7 December 2006 for $20 million in cash. Symantec incorporated Revivio's technology into its data protection portfolio.
