= Dynamic Microprocessor Associates =

Dynamic Microprocessor Associates, Inc.
- Type: Subsidiary of Symantec
- Founded: United States
- Headquarters: United States
- Parent: Gen Digital

Dynamic Microprocessor Associates, Inc. (DMA), was an American software company founded in New York City in 1979 by Lee Rautenberg. Though best known for its remote administration product pcAnywhere, DMA also developed and marketed the relational database management system Formula IV, the BBS software Chairman and the modem control software ASCOM. It was acquired by Symantec on August 21, 1991, for US$22 million.
