= FormFlow =

Line of electronic form products

- Type: Electronic forms
- Inception: 1990s
- Manufacturer: Delrina
- Available: No
- Last production year: 2004

FormFlow was the name of a line of electronic forms products initially created and sold by Delrina in the early- to mid-1990s.

== History ==
The first product in this line was PerForm, which was designed to work under GEM for MS-DOS. The PerForm PRO and FormFlow products that succeeded PerForm were designed to work on Windows 3.0 and Windows 3.1 respectively. FormFlow later had native support for Windows 95 starting with version 2.0 in 1996.

Delrina was bought by Symantec late in 1995, and the electronic forms division was sold to JetForm in 1996. JetForm, which later changed its name to Accelio, was in turn was bought by Adobe Systems. The electronic forms products were officially end-of-lifed in 2004.
