= Nutanix =

American enterprise virtualization and storage company

Nutanix, Inc.
- Type: Public
- Traded as: Nasdaq: NTNX (Class A); S&P 400 component
- Founded: 2009; 17 years ago
- Founders: Dheeraj Pandey; Mohit Aron; Ajeet Singh
- Headquarters: San Jose, California, U.S.
- Key people: Rajiv Ramaswami (president & CEO)
- Products: Enterprise cloud platform; Business software; Internet of things
- Revenue: ▲US$2,538 million (2025)
- Operating income: ▲US$173 million (2025)
- Net income: ▲US$188 million (2025)
- Total assets: ▲US$3,283 million (2025)
- Total equity: ▲US$–695 million (2025)
- Number of employees: 7,800 (2025)
- Website: nutanix.com
- Footnotes; Financials as of July 31, 2025.

Nutanix, Inc. is an American cloud computing company that develops software for datacenters and hybrid multi-cloud deployments. It is based in San Jose, California.

== History ==
Nutanix was founded on September 23, 2009, by Dheeraj Pandey, Mohit Aron and Ajeet Singh. In early 2013 Aron left Nutanix to start Cohesity, a privately held computer data storage company.

Venture capital firms invested $312.2 million over five rounds of funding in Nutanix. The company reached a $1 billion valuation by 2013, which made it known as a "unicorn startup". It raised $140 million in a Series E round of financing in 2014, valuing the company at approximately $2 billion. Nutanix's backers included Lightspeed Venture Partners, Khosla Ventures, and Blumberg Capital.

Nutanix filed for an initial public offering (IPO) in December 2015, reporting a net loss in its fiscal year ending July 2015 of $126 million. In August 2016, Nutanix announced it had acquired PernixData. The IPO on September 30, 2016, raised about $230 million after selling 14.87 million shares at a price of $16. This was the biggest VC-backed IPO of 2016 in the U.S. Analysts expected Nutanix's public offering would be delayed.

In May 2017, Nutanix partnered with IBM to create a series of datacenter hardware appliances using IBM Power Systems for business apps. In March 2018, Nutanix announced the acquisition of Minjar, based in Bangalore and Netsil, a San Francisco-based cloud application monitoring startup. Later the same year, Nutanix acquired the DaaS startup Frame. On March 28, 2018, Nutanix partnered with HYCU to develop data protection software built for hyper-converged infrastructure environments. On June 1, 2019, Nutanix appointed Brian Stevens to its board of directors. In March 2020, Sohaib Abbasi joined the company's board of directors.

Due to the COVID-19 pandemic, Nutanix announced a furlough impacting about 1,500 employees in April 2020. In June 2020, Nutanix added Virginia Gambale to its board of directors. In December, 2020, Pandey was replaced as Chief Executive by Rajiv Ramaswami, who had been the Chief Operating Officer at VMware. VMware filed a lawsuit, alleging a conflict of interest, but dropped the legal fight a year later.

In 2021, the company transitioned from making hardware appliances to focusing on subscription software.

In 2022, MinIO alleged that Nutanix had been violating MinIO's free software license, and had done so for three years; with negotiations over the matter leading to no resolution, MinIO reported having revoked Nutanix's license. According to Adam Armstrong, writing for TechTarget.com, Nutanix "initially... deny[ied] any wrongdoing" but "walked that position back a week later", acknowledging it had "'discovered some inadvertent omissions in Nutanix Objects' open source attribution and notices required under the Apache 2.0 license,' and apologized for the oversight".

=== Acquisitions ===
Date	Company	Description	References
August 2016	PernixData	Software for virtualizing server-side flash memory and random-access memory	
August 2016	Calm.io	DevOps automation platform	
March 2018	Netsil	Cloud application monitoring startup	
March 2018	Minjar	The maker of Botmetric, a service for public clouds	
August 2018	MainFrame2 Inc.	Cloud-based Windows desktop and application delivery	
December 2023	D2iQ	Manage Kubernetes at scale easily	

== See also ==
- Harvester (HCI)
