= BetterCloud =

American information technology company

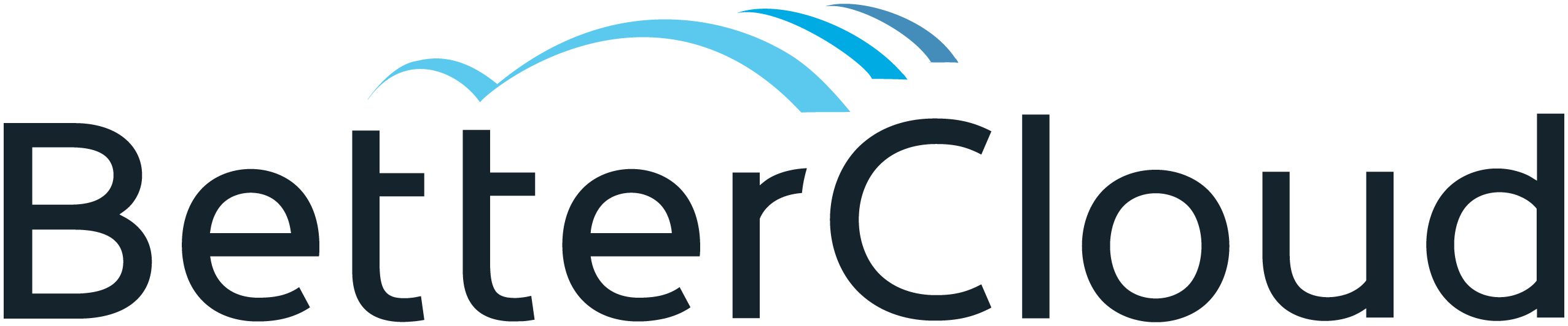
- Type: Private
- Industry: Internet, Technology
- Founder: David Politis
- Headquarters: 330 7th Avenue, 4th Floor, New York, New York 10001 3525 Piedmont Rd NE, Building 6, Suite 500, Atlanta, GA 30305, United States
- Area served: Worldwide
- Key people: Jesse Levin - CEO; David Politis - Founder and Executive Chairman
- Website: www.bettercloud.com

BetterCloud, an independent software vendor based in New York, NY and with engineering offices in Atlanta, GA, builds unified SaaS management software. A venture-backed startup, BetterCloud has raised $187 million in total funding, with the most recent round was led by Warburg Pincus with series F funding with $75 million raised to date. A previous round of funding was done in April 2018 which was led by Bain Capital Ventures. In December 2016, BetterCloud completed pivot from G Suite to general SaaS management. In March 2026, BetterCloud was acquired by CoreStack.

== History ==
BetterCloud, founded in November 2011 in New York City, by founder and former CEO David Politis and former CTO David Hardwick. Soon after, the company launched DomainWatch, which was a security tool for Google Docs, Google Sites and Google Calendar.

In May 2012 shortly after its launch, BetterCloud raised $2.2 million in seed funding from undisclosed angel investors. In January 2013, with its FlashPanel product reportedly serving 15,000 domains and 5.5 million end-users, the company raised a Series A round of $5 million in venture capital from Flybridge Capital Partners, Greycroft Partners and TriBeCa Venture Partners, bringing its total funding at the time to $7.2 million.

On September 25, 2013, the company successfully raised a Series B round of $6 million led by Flybridge Capital Partners with participation from Greycroft Partners, BLH Venture Partners, TriBeCa Venture Partners, Bear Creek Capital, and Hallett Capital. With a total funding of $13.2 million, the company has announced it is expanding its products to serve as the foundational layer for the cloud based software space, serving companies such as Zendesk and Salesforce.com.

In February 2015, the company rebranded its early product, FlashPanel, to BetterCloud for Google Apps, and also announced the launch of an additional product, BetterCloud for Office 365 [Beta]. The launch of an insight, monitoring, and alerting product for Microsoft Office 365 rounded out the company's offerings of solutions for the two major cloud messaging and collaboration platforms. And in March 2015, BetterCloud raised an additional $25 million in funding, led by Accel Partners and with participation from all existing investors. In April 2018, BetterCloud raised $60 million in a Series E funding led by Bain Capital Ventures bringing the company's total funding to $107 million. With this investment, the company doubled its valuation to $270 million.

In December 2016, BetterCloud pivoted from G Suite to general SaaS management. As of September 2018, the company supported connections to 10 SaaS apps: G Suite, Atlassian, Box, Dropbox, Namely, Office 365, Okta, Salesforce, Slack, and Zendesk.

BetterCloud closed a $60 million Series E funding round in April 2018, led by Bain Capital Ventures' Enrique Salem, former CEO of Symantec. This round doubled the company's valuation to $270 million. One month later, BetterCloud and Okta, an identity and access management provider, announced a partnership to connect their.

In March 2019 BetterCloud opened its platform's operations dashboard to any SaaS.

In September 2019, Dropbox announced a partnership with BetterCloud and an investment of $5 million. In the same month, the company also launched the Integration Center.

In May 2023, Jesse Levin was named CEO, replacing founder David Politis who became Executive Chairman.

In June 2022, Vista Equity Partners bought a majority stake in the company for an undisclosed amount.

== Corporate affairs ==
=== Leadership ===
BetterCloud is managed by CEO Jesse Levin. Other key executives are:

- Sean Hill, Chief Financial Officer
- David Bean, Chief Technical Officer
- Alyxa Lease, Chief People Officer
- David Politis, Former CEO & Executive Chairman

=== Customer and revenue ===
As of 2018, the company reports a network of around 2,500 customers, 14,000 IT professionals, and operates in around 60 countries.

== Awards ==
- BetterCloud was ranked #11 on Crain's Best Places to Work in NYC 2018.
