= HYCU =

American software company

HYCU, Inc.
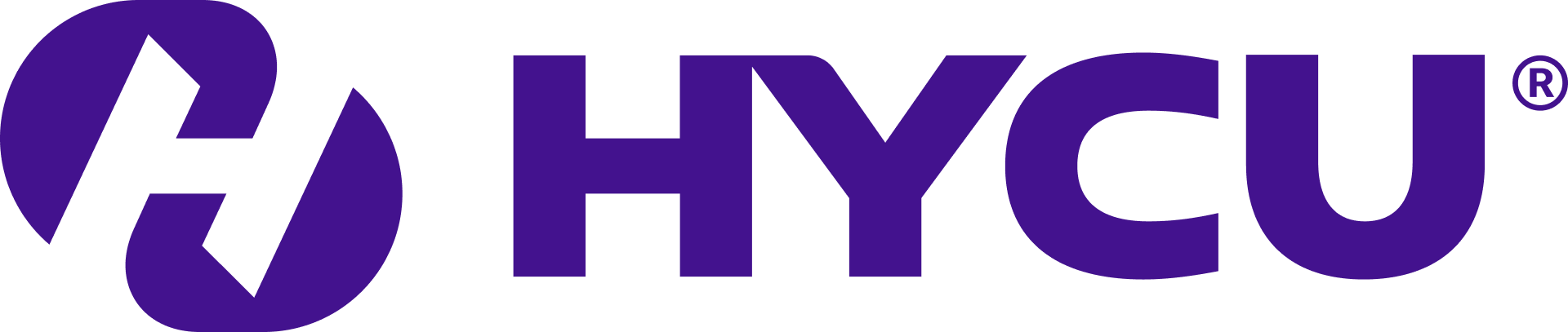
- Company type: Private
- Industry: Software, Data protection
- Founded: 2018; 7 years ago
- Founders: Simon Taylor, Goran Garevski
- Headquarters: Boston, Massachusetts, United States
- Area served: Worldwide
- Products: Data protection and disaster recovery software
- Number of employees: 200+ (2024)
- Website: hycu.com

HYCU, Inc. (pronounced /ˈhaɪkuː/) is an American software company headquartered in Boston, Massachusetts. The company specializes in backup and disaster recovery software for on-premises, SaaS, and hybrid cloud environments.

== History ==
HYCU was established in 2018 as a spin-off from Comtrade Software, focusing on data protection technology initially developed for Nutanix environments. Founded by Simon Taylor and Goran Garevski, the company became independently funded in 2018 and launched its Protégé platform for data protection and migration.

The company expanded its offerings to support additional platforms, including Dell EMC, Google Cloud Platform, and Atlassian. In 2021, HYCU secured $87.5 million in a Series A funding round, followed by a $53 million Series B round in 2022, bringing total funding to over $140 million.

== Products ==
HYCU’s primary platform, R-Cloud, provides automated backup, disaster recovery, and data migration across cloud and on-premises applications. Its R-Graph tool offers visualization of data protection coverage across SaaS, cloud, and on-premises environments.
