= HyperACCESS =

Family of terminal emulation software by Hilgraeve

- Developer: Hilgraeve
- Release: Before 1985
- Stable release: 9.1 / July 31, 2015; 11 years ago
- Operating system: Microsoft Windows
- Website: www.hilgraeve.com/hyperaccess/

HyperTerminal
- Developer: Hilgraeve
- Release: Before 1985
- Stable release: 7.1 / May 11, 2014; 12 years ago
- Operating system: Microsoft Windows
- Website: www.hilgraeve.com/hyperterminal/

HyperACCESS (sometimes known as HyperTerminal) is a family of terminal emulation software by Hilgraeve. A version of HyperACCESS called HyperTerminal is included in some versions of Windows.

== History ==
It was the first software product from Hilgraeve, and it was initially designed to let 8-bit Heath computers communicate over a modem. In 1985, this same product was ported to IBM PCs and compatible systems, as well as Heath/Zenith's Z-100 non-PC-compatible MS-DOS computer. Over the years, the same version of this technology would be ported to other operating systems, including OS/2, Windows 95 and Windows NT. It has earned a total of five Editor's Choice awards from PC Magazine.

In 1995, Hilgraeve licensed a low-end version of HyperACCESS, known as HyperTerminal, to Microsoft for use in their set of communications utilities. It was bundled with Windows 95 through Windows XP, but is no longer bundled with Windows Vista, Windows 7, Windows 8, or later Windows.

The commercial products HyperTerminal Private Edition and HyperACCESS both support all versions of Windows up to and including Windows 11.

== Protocols ==
- Display: Minitel, Viewdata, VT100, VT52
- File transfer: ASCII, Kermit, XMODEM, YMODEM/YMODEM-G, and ZMODEM

== See also ==
- List of terminal emulators
