= Leonard Development Group =

- Type: Subsidiary of Symantec
- Founded: United States
- Headquarters: United States

Leonard Development Group was a company that made the SmartWorks integrated suite of Macintosh software. It was founded in 1984 in Jacksonville, Florida. It was acquired by Symantec on June 24, 1991. A new version, renamed GreatWorks, was released in summer 1991.
