= ON Technology =

Software company founded by Mitch Kapor, acquired by Symantec in 2003

ON Technology Corporation
- Type: Subsidiary of Symantec
- Industry: Computers
- Founded: 1987
- Defunct: 2003
- Headquarters: Waltham, Massachusetts, US
- Parent: Symantec

Older logo

ON Technology Corporation was a software company based in Waltham, Massachusetts. It was founded in 1987 by Mitch Kapor following his departure from Lotus Development Corporation, where he had created Lotus 1-2-3. The company's initial aim was to build an object-oriented PC desktop environment offering an integrated suite of applications. It was ultimately acquired by Symantec in 2003 for its desktop systems management software.

== History ==
In the early 1990s, ON Technology was acquired by Notework Corporation, a vendor of LAN email systems. Although Notework's management took control of the combined company, the ON Technology name was retained. Following the merger, the company expanded its product portfolio through a series of acquisitions, adding email software (DaVinci, a message handling system-based email product), antivirus technology, corporate internet usage monitoring, an IP firewall and desktop systems management tools.

In 1995, the company went public, providing capital to fund further product acquisitions. The company built a go-to-market model that distinguished it from peers: a 30-day free trial offer combined with telesales targeting small and medium-sized businesses.

In 1998, ON Technology restructured. It sold its small and medium business product range to Elron Software and refocused on enterprise customers, retaining the MeetingMaker calendaring product and the ON Command CCM desktop systems management platform. ON subsequently divested Meeting Maker in a private transaction; the product later passed to PeopleCube. The company's remaining asset was CCM, its enterprise systems management software.

ON Technology was acquired by Symantec on 27 October 2003, specifically to extend Symantec's capabilities in desktop systems management.
