= Fast Track, Inc. =

Former American software company

- Type: Subsidiary of Symantec
- Industry: Computers
- Founded: 1987; 39 years ago Germantown, Maryland, United States
- Parent: Symantec

Fast Track, Inc., was a software development company in the United States. It was founded by Robert H. Nichols in 1987 in Germantown, Maryland. The company was primarily known for its distributed network management products, primarily Exposé, which is cross-compatible with servers running VINES, NetWare, and Windows NT. It collects information from the services through the Simple Network Management Protocol (SNMP). Version 3 in 1994 introduced SuperMIB, a graphical framework for representing nodes in the network.

In March 1996, Symantec acquired Fast Track for US$7.22 million worth of stock. The acquisition gave Symantec their first codebase based on SNMP, which they promptly integrated into the Premier Edition of Norton Administrator Suite, their second stab at a network management product, in September 1996. This version of Norton Administrator Suite was met with mixed reception and poor adoption from customers, and by March 1997 Symantec had divested parts of Fast Track to other software companies.
