= Lightspeed Venture Partners =

American venture capital firm

- Type: Private
- Founded: 2000
- Founder: Barry Eggers; Christopher Schaepe; Ravi Mhatre; Peter Nieh
- Headquarters: Menlo Park, California, United States
- Area served: Menlo Park, San Francisco, New York City, Tel-Aviv, New Delhi, Bangalore, Mumbai, Singapore, London, Paris, Berlin
- Key people: Bejul Somaia, Ravi Mhatre
- Products: Venture Capital
- AUM: $50 Billion
- Website: lsvp.com

Lightspeed Venture Partners is an American venture capital firm focusing on seed stage, early stage investments and growth stage investments in the enterprise, fintech, consumer and healthcare sectors. Lightspeed has eleven offices globally and as of 2023 had approximately US$35 billion in assets under management.

== History ==
Lightspeed was founded in 2000 by enterprise founders Barry Eggers, Christopher Schaepe, Ravi Mhatre, Peter Nieh. They previously worked at Weiss, Peck & Greer and went to Stanford University together.

Lightspeed opened its first international office in Tel-Aviv in 2006 following Yoni Cheifetz joining the firm. This effort soon extended to India when Bejul Somaia joined the firm in 2008 to begin the firms India practice and then in Singapore in 2022. For the next decade, Lightspeed Venture Partners largely remained an enterprise software and infrastructure specialists.

== Investments ==
Lightspeed led the Series A in Riverbed Technology in 2002 which went on to become one of the largest enterprise IPOs in 2006.

Lightspeed led the Series B of Mulesoft in 2007 which went on to IPO in 2017 before less than a year later being acquired by Salesforce for $6.5 billion.

Lightspeed led the Series A of Appdynamics in 2008 and on the eve of its expected IPO the company was acquired by Cisco for $3.7 billion in 2017.

Lightspeed led the Series A of Nutanix in 2010 and the company went public in 2017 with the stock soaring more than 130% in its public debut.

Lightspeed led the Series B of Nest in 2011 and it was later acquired by Google for $3.2 billion in an all cash transaction in 2014.

Lightspeed led the Series C of Nicira in 2011 which was acquired by VMWare a year later for $1.2 billion.

In 2012, Lightspeed became the first venture investor in Snap Inc., a year after Snapchat was launched. Snapchat raised $485,000 in its seed round and an undisclosed amount of bridge funding from Lightspeed Venture Partners in 2012. Lightspeed Venture Partners was the fourth largest shareholder during Snap's IPO in 2017.

Lightspeed led the Series B in Affirm in 2013 and later went public in 2021 at nearly a $30 billion dollar market capitalization.

Lightspeed led the Series C of Guardant Health in 2014 which went public in 2018.

Lightspeed led the Series A of Rubrik in 2014 and is the largest shareholder in the company. Rubrik was founded by Bipul Sinha, a Venture Partner at Lightspeed.

Lightspeed seeded Forty Seven in 2015 and the company was later acquired by Gilead for $4.9 billion in 2020.

Lightspeed is the seed investor in Navan, the seed investor in Mistral, the seed investor in Thoughtspot, the seed investor in Ultima Genomics, the seed of Orca Bio, the Series A investor in Ai search company Glean Technologies, the Series A investor in Grafana, the series B of B2B marketplace Faire and the Series C of Cato Networks.

In 2018, the company invested in Multiverse, a British educational technology company. In June 2022, Lightspeed reinvested in the company as part of a $220 million investment round.

In February 2026, the company invested $70m in Naboo, a French Mice procurement platform.

== Funding ==
In 2022, Lightspeed raised $7.1 billion across four flagship funds including Lightspeed Venture Partners XIV-A/B, L.P. ("Fund XIV") with $1.98 billion, Lightspeed Venture Partners Select V, L.P. ("Select Fund V") with $2.26 billion, and Lightspeed Opportunity Fund II, L.P. ("Opportunity Fund II") with $2.36 billion of committed capital. Separately, Lightspeed India Partners today announced the closing of a $500M early stage fund ("LSIP Fund IV") as well as a partnership with blockchain firm, Lightspeed Faction.

In April 2020, Lightspeed Venture Partners raised $4.2 billion across three funds: $890 million for its latest early-stage venture fund, a $1.83 billion growth fund for later-stage investments, and a $1.5 billion opportunity fund for doubling down on winners in its international portfolio.

In March 2016, the company raised two new funds totaling in $1.2 billion.

In 2014, Lightspeed closed Lightspeed X, a $1 billion fund focused on the Enterprise, Consumer and Cleantech markets. As of 2012, the firm had $3 billion in committed capital.
