= Datastorm Technologies =

Company that made computer communications software

DataStorm Technologies Inc.
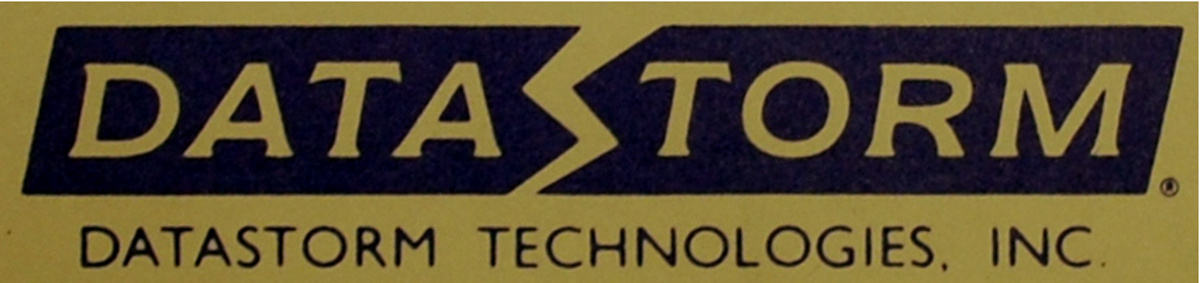
- Type: Private
- Industry: Data transmission & Dial-up Internet access
- Founded: 1986
- Founders: Bruce Barkelew; Thomas Smith
- Defunct: 1996
- Headquarters: Columbia, Missouri, United States
- Products: ProComm Plus-DOS; ProComm Plus-Windows

Datastorm Technologies, Inc., was a computer software company that existed from 1986 until 1996. Bruce Barkelew and Thomas Smith founded the company to develop and publish ProComm, a general-purpose communications program for personal computers. ProComm flourished in the pre-World Wide Web world, when personal computers used modems to connect over telephone lines with other individual computers, online services such as CompuServe, bulletin board systems (BBSs), Telnet and Gopher sites, and the like. Datastorm was the first company to evolve from a shareware publisher into a large commercial software publisher. ProComm 2.4.3 for MS-DOS is still available as shareware.

== History ==
The death of Andrew Fluegelman, creator of PC-Talk, left a gap in the offerings of dial-up communications and terminal emulation software. Bruce Barkelew and Tom Smith, computer science students at the University of Missouri, formed PIL Software Systems in 1985 to develop ProComm. They distributed the program as shareware through bulletin board systems.

Based on the program's popularity, Barkelew and Smith founded Datastorm Technologies Inc. in 1986 to build a full-fledged company around the product. The founders chose Columbia, Missouri, as the company's headquarters because of the relatively low cost of living there to tap into the pool of programmers graduating from the University of Missouri's computer science department. Datastorm financed its growth by reinvesting its earnings instead of seeking outside investment. In 1992, they were ranked 376 in the Inc. 500.

The company produced a combination 16/32-bit Procomm Plus for Windows, which included an early web browser called Web Zeppelin. Procomm Plus for Windows supported the remote imaging protocol (RIP) graphic terminal language. This upgrade enabled the display of higher-resolution images than the ANSI escape codes that most bulletin board systems used at the time. In November 1993, the data transmission program reached the number one ranking on PC Magazine's list of top retail software.

In 1995, Datastorm sued Excalibur Communications over software infringement. Datastorm became the first company to sue a vendor for infringement of its software using the shareware model.

Datastorm grew through 40 consecutive profitable quarters, then was acquired by Quarterdeck in 1996 for over US$70 million. Quarterdeck was later purchased by Symantec. Support for the last release of Procomm, version 4.8, was discontinued in 2002.

== Awards ==
- 1989: BYTE "Distinction" Award
- 1992: Dvorak PC Telecommunications Excellence Award
- 1997: Shareware Industry Awards Shareware Hall of Fame
