= Certance =

Computer tape drive designer and manufacturer

Certance, LLC

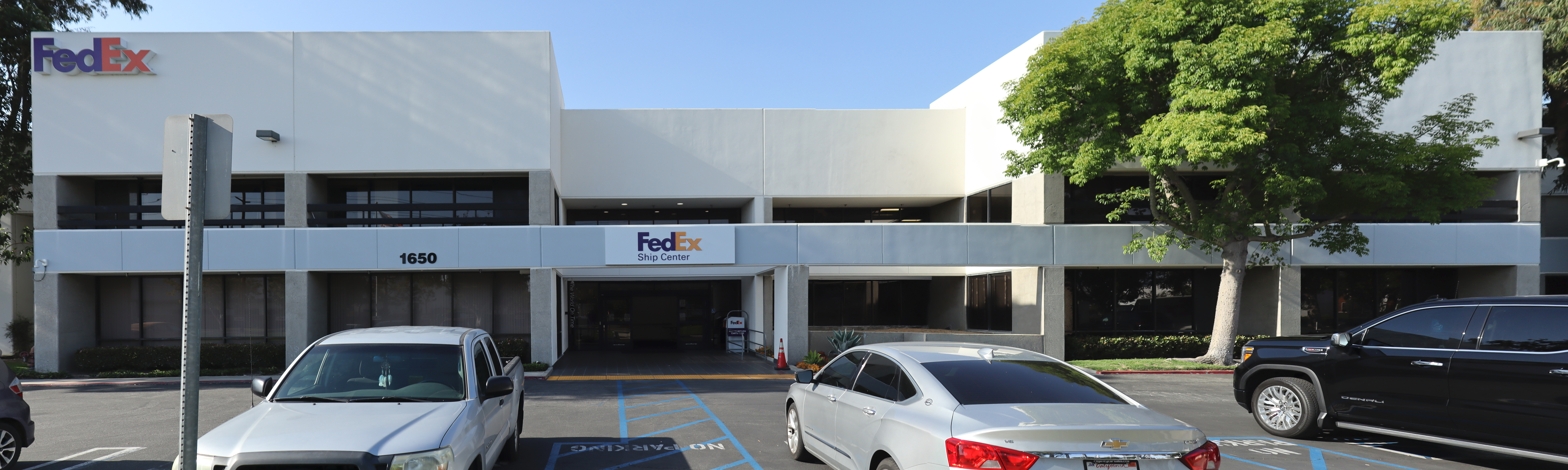
- Former headquarters in Costa Mesa, California; now a FedEx Ship Center
- Type: Private
- Industry: Information technology
- Founded: 1996; 30 years ago in Costa Mesa, California, United States
- Defunct: 2005
- Fate: Acquired by Quantum Corporation
- Headquarters: Costa Mesa, California, United States
- Products: Computer tape drives

Certance, LLC, was a privately held company engaged in design and manufacture of computer tape drives.

Based in Costa Mesa, California, Certance designed and manufactured drives using a variety of tape formats, including Travan, DDS, and Linear Tape-Open computer tape drives. Certance was one of the three original technology partners — Certance, IBM, and Hewlett-Packard — that created the Linear Tape-Open technology.

In 2005, Certance was acquired by Quantum Corporation.

== History ==
The company began in 1996 as the removable storage systems division of Seagate Technology. This division was formed when Seagate acquired Conner Peripherals, further consolidating the tape technology market. Connor had previously acquired Archive Corporation, including the assets of Irwin Magnetic Systems, Cipher Data Products, Maynard Electronics, and Kennedy Company. Software from this consolidation, notably including Backup Exec, was made part of the Seagate Software division.

In a 2000 restructuring, involving Seagate Technology and Veritas Software, the division was spun off into the independent company Seagate Removable Storage Systems. The company was the worldwide unit volume shipment leader in 2001, 2002, and 2003.

The company name was changed to "Certance" in 2003.

In October 2004, Quantum Corporation announced an agreement to acquire Certance in an all-cash transaction valued at US$60 million. The Register reported that Certance had announced earlier that month that it was the first vendor to ship a third-generation LTO tape drive.

Quantum completed the acquisition on 5 January 2005 for US$60 million in cash.

Tape technology companies merged into Seagate and spun off as Certance

Seagate
Seagate

Connor; Peripherals
Seagate; Removable; Storage; Systems
Certance

Archive; Corporation

Maynard; Electronics

Cipher Data; Products

Irwin; Magnetics

Kennedy; Company
