= Backup Exec =

Backup and recovery software from Arctera

- Original author: Maynard Electronics
- Developer: Arctera
- Release: 1980s
- Stable release: 22.2 / Oct, 2023
- Written in: C, C++, C#, .Net, Python
- Operating system: Windows 2019, Windows 2016, Windows 2012 R2, Windows 2012, Windows 2008 R2, Windows 2008, Windows 2003 R2, Windows 10, Windows 8.1, Windows 7, Red Hat Enterprise Linux, SUSE Linux Enterprise Server
- Platform: Windows Server, Linux, VMware vSphere, Microsoft Hyper-V
- Size: 2.4 GB
- Available in: English, French, German, Italian, Japanese, Korean, Portuguese, Russian, Simplified Chinese, Spanish, Traditional Chinese
- License: Proprietary commercial software
- Website: http://www.backupexec.com

Backup Exec is a commercial backup software product from Arctera originally released in the 1980s. It has been owned by several different companies, including Veritas, Symantec, and Seagate.

With its client/server design, Backup Exec provides backup and restore capabilities for servers, applications and workstations across the network. Backup Exec recovers data, applications, databases, or systems from an individual file, mailbox item, table object, or entire server. Current versions of the software support Microsoft, VMware, and Linux, among others. Backup Exec also provides integrated deduplication, replication, and disaster recovery capabilities and helps to manage multiple backup servers or multi-drive tape loaders. In addition, Backup Exec's family of agents and options offer features for scaling the Backup Exec environment and extending platform and feature support.

== History ==
Within the "backup" portion of the data protection spectrum, one Arctera product, Backup Exec, has been in the market for more than two decades. Since the early days of Microsoft's journey to turn its Windows Server into the world's dominant client-server operating system, Backup Exec has been one of a handful of technologies to protect it. As the Windows Server grew to become a platform of choice for application enablement and user productivity, Backup Exec's media/platform support, application support, and internal operation evolved at a similar pace.

Backup Exec has a long history of successive owner-companies. Its earliest roots stretch back to the early 1980s when Maynard Electronics wrote a bundle of software drivers to help sell their tape-drive products.

Early product logo

- 1982 – Maynard Electronics founded. Maynard's software is known as "MaynStream."
- 1989 – Maynard Electronics is acquired by Archive Corporation MaynStream is available for MS-DOS, Windows, Classic Mac OS, OS/2, and NetWare.
- 1991 – Quest Development Corporation is independently formed to develop backup software under contract for Symantec.

product logo c.1994

- 1993 – Conner Peripherals acquires Archive Corporation and renames the software "Backup Exec".
- 1993 – Quest acquires rights to FastBack for Mac, and hired its principal author, Tom Chappell, from Fifth Generation Systems.
- 1994 – Conner creates a subsidiary, Arcada Software, by acquiring Quest and merging it with their existing software division.
- 1995 – Arcada acquires the SyTron division from Rexon, including their OS/2 backup software.
- 1996 – Conner is acquired by Seagate Technology and Arcada is merged into its subsidiary Seagate Software.
- 1999 – VERITAS Software acquires Seagate Software's Network and Storage Management Group, which included Backup Exec.
- 2005 – Symantec acquires VERITAS, including Backup Exec.
- 2015 – Symantec announced they would be splitting off the Information Management Business which contains Backup Exec, into a new company named Veritas Technologies Corporation acquired by the Carlyle Group.
- 2016 – Veritas Technologies re-launches as an independent company which contains Backup Exec.
- 2024 - Backup Exec, along with InfoScale and Veritas Data Compliance and Governance unit, split to an independent company called Arctera.

== Architecture ==
=== Core components ===
The core components that are contained in a basic Backup Exec architecture include the following:

- A Backup Exec server is the heart of a Backup Exec installation. The Backup Exec server is a Windows server that:
  - Runs the Backup Exec software and services that control backup and restore operations
  - Is attached to and controls storage hardware
  - Maintains the Backup Exec database, media catalogs, and device catalogs
- The Backup Exec Administration Console is the interface to control a Backup Exec server.
  - The Administration Console can be run directly on a Backup Exec server or from a remote system (using a Backup Exec Remote Administration Console).
- Storage devices attached to the Backup Exec server contain the media on which backup data is written.
  - Backup Exec supports many different types of devices and media, including cloud, disk-based and tape-based. Backup Exec supports unlimited number of clients, NDMP-NAS systems, tape drives, and tape libraries.
- Clients are the systems that contain the data which the Backup Exec server backs up.
  - Clients can include database servers, application servers, file servers, and individual workstations.
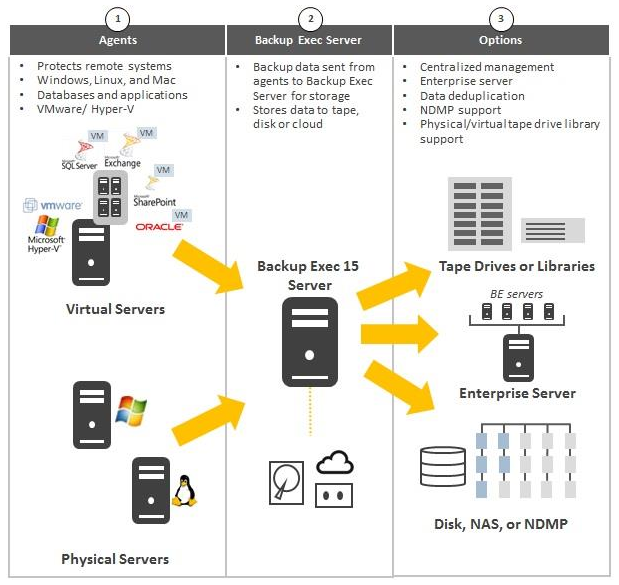
    An illustration of the Backup Exec platform

=== Add-on components ===
Backup Exec Agents and Options expand the features and functionality of core Backup Exec server to support the most common server applications, including Microsoft Exchange, SharePoint and SQL Server, Oracle, Windows and Linux clients, server operating systems, and the Hyper-V and VMware hypervisors. Not all agents are agents in the traditional sense. For example, the Agent for VMware and Hyper-V is not carrying out the backup process. The agent is simply collecting meta data (takes a few seconds) so that Backup Exec can perform granular recoveries directly from storage at a point in the future - no mounting required.

Here is a list of Backup Exec Agents and Options:

Agents	Options
Agent for VMware and Hyper-V	Deduplication Option
Agent for Applications and Databases	Enterprise Server Option
Agent for Windows	NDMP Option
Agent for Mac (no longer supported BE16)	Library Expansion Option
Agent for Linux	Virtual Tape Library (VTL) Unlimited Drive Option
Remote Media Agent for Linux (RMAL)	

=== Tape format ===
When used with tape drives, Backup Exec uses the Microsoft Tape Format (MTF), which is also used by Windows NTBackup, backup utilities included in Microsoft SQL Server, and many other backup vendors and is compatible with BKF. Microsoft Tape Format (MTF) was originally Maynard's (Backup Exec's first authors) proprietary backup Tape Format (MTF) and was later licensed by Microsoft as Windows standard tape format. In addition, Microsoft also licensed and incorporated Backup Exec's backup engine into Windows NT, the server version of Windows.

== Installation ==
Backup Exec and its options can be installed on a local computer, a remote computer, within a virtual environment, or on a public cloud "Infrastructure as a Service (IaaS)" virtualization platform. Backup Exec supports the Backup Exec server installation on 64-bit operating systems only. However, the Agent for Windows can be installed on 32-bit operating systems. Several methods are available for installing Backup Exec. An Environment Check runs automatically during installation to make sure that the installation process can complete. If Backup Exec finds any configuration issues that can be fixed during the installation, or that may prevent Installation, warnings appear.

Backup Exec can be installed using the following:

- Installation wizard from the Backup Exec installation media, which guides through the installation process.
- Push-install Backup Exec to remote computers through Terminal Services and the installation media is on a shared drive (network share).
- Command line, which is called silent mode installation. The silent mode installation uses the Setup.exe program on the Backup Exec installation media.

Additionally, Backup Exec installation media also has a Remote Administrator feature which can be installed on a remote computer or workstation to administer the Backup Exec server remotely.

Backup Exec may install the additional products:

- Microsoft Report Viewer 2010 SP1
- Microsoft.NET Framework 4.6
- Microsoft Visual C++ 2008 ServicePack 1 Redistributable Package MFCSecurity Update
- Microsoft Visual C++ 2010 ServicePack 1 Redistributable Package MFC Security Update
- Microsoft Visual C++ 2012 Redistributable Package
- Microsoft Visual C++ 2015 Redistributable Package
- Microsoft SQL Server 2014 Express with SP2

== Configuration ==
Backup Exec installations can have one or more Backup Exec servers, which are responsible for moving data from one or more locations to a storage medium, including cloud, disk, tape, and OST device. The data may be from the local system or from a remote system. There are two primary Backup Exec architectures:

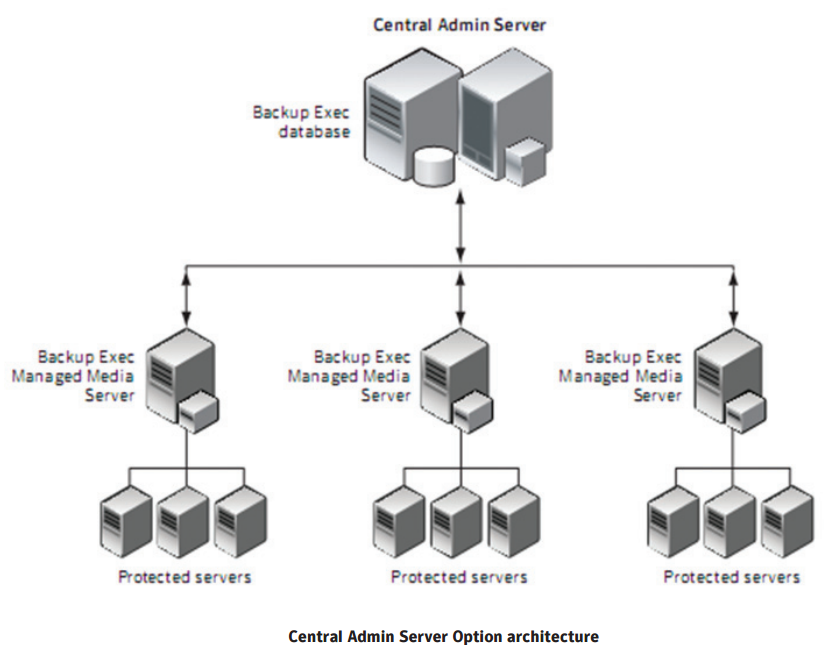
Central Admin Server Option architecture

1. Standalone Backup Exec configuration (Two-Tier)

A single Backup Exec server is assigned the standalone Backup Exec server role. Each server runs the Backup Exec software and the services that control backup and restore operations of multiple clients. Each Backup Exec server maintains its own Backup Exec database, media catalogs, and device catalogs.

2. Central Admin Server Option (CASO) configuration (Three-Tier)

Large environments may contain multiple Backup Exec servers responsible for backing up many different client systems. Backup Exec servers in large environments can run independently of each other if each server is managed separately. Separate server management may not be an issue if there are only two or three Backup Exec servers, but it can become unwieldy as the environment grows. Backup Exec can centralize the management of multiple Backup Exec servers using an add-on option called the Backup Exec Central Admin Server Option (CASO). CASO ensures that everything throughout the network is protected by a single system that can be managed from one console and also balances the workload across all Backup Exec servers in the environment.

In a CASO environment, one Backup Exec server can be configured to be the Central Admin Server (CAS), while other Backup Execs become managed Backup Exec servers (MBESs) that are managed by the CAS. The CASO configuration simplifies the management and monitoring of enterprise-level environments.

== Features and Capabilities ==
Backup Exec includes the following features and capabilities:

- Backup Options:
  - Image-based backups for VMware and Hyper-V
  - Full backup method
  - Differential backup method
  - Incremental backup method
  - Synthetic Backups
  - Advanced Open File Option (AOFO)
  - Backup to disk, tape, or cloud regardless of location.
- Recovery Options:
  - Catalog-assisted granular recovery of objects, files, folders, applications, or VMs (including Exchange, SharePoint, SQL Server, and Active Directory) directly from storage, with no mounting or staging.
  - Restore to different targets or hardware (Dissimilar Hardware Recovery)
  - Restore to physical or virtual servers
  - Simplified Disaster Recovery (SDR)
  - Guided Search and Restore: Built-in indexing and the ability to restore files through search.
  - True image restore
- Cloud Support
  - Free S3 Cloud Connector for Backup Exec to back up data to an S3-compatible cloud storage
  - Free Azure Cloud Connector for Backup Exec to write data to Microsoft Azure cloud storage
  - Cloud Connector can be deployed on-premises and in-the-cloud
  - Backup Exec UI has predefined templates for disk-to-disk-to-cloud and direct-to-cloud backups.
  - support for:
    - Amazon Simple Storage Service (S3)
    - Microsoft Azure Storage
    - Google Cloud Standard
    - Amazon Storage Gateway-VTL (iSCSI)
    - Quantum Q-Cloud (OST Cloud Storage plug-in)
    - Amazon S3 and Microsoft Azure via the NetApp AltaVault/SteelStore/Whitewater Appliance
  - Support for Backup Exec within a virtual environment on a public cloud "Infrastructure as a Service (IaaS)" virtualization platform
  - Hybrid/Private Cloud Services
- Virtual Server protection support
  - Multi-hypervisor support (Microsoft Hyper-V, VMware vSphere, & Citrix XenServer)
  - Supports Agentless backup of both Hyper-V and VMware virtual machines
  - Supports image-level, off-host backups of virtual machines
  - Support for VMware Changed Block Tracking (CBT)
  - Block Optimization Support: Intelligent skipping of unused blocks within a virtual disk file
  - Integration with Microsoft Volume Shadow Copy Service and VMware's vStorage APIs for Data Protection (VADP)
  - From a single-pass backup of a virtual machine, recover:
    - An entire virtual machine
    - Individual virtual machine disk (VMDK) and virtual hard disk (VHD/X) files
    - Individual files and folders
    - Entire applications (Microsoft Exchange Server, Microsoft SharePoint, Microsoft Active Directory, Microsoft SQL Server, Oracle Database)
    - Granular application objects from Microsoft Exchange Server, Microsoft SharePoint, Microsoft Active Directory, Microsoft SQL Server
  - Fully integrated Physical-to-Virtual (P2V), which can be used for migrations or instant recovery
  - Also supports - Backup to Virtual (B2V) and Point-in-time Conversion (PIT)
- Integrated Data Deduplication:
  - Integrated block-level data deduplication
  - Client, server-side, or OST appliance deduplication
  - Client deduplication supported for both Windows as well as Linux computers
  - Optimized duplication (Opt Dup) supports backup "replication" from MMS/MBE to CAS/ CAS to MMS/MBE
- Security and Data Encryption:
  - Software encryption
  - Hardware encryption (T10 encryption standard)
  - Database Encryption Key (DEK)
  - FIPS Version: OpenSSL FIPS 2.0.5
  - Secure TLS protocol for its SSL control connection (over NDMP) between the Backup Exec Server and the Agent on a remote computer
- Management and Reporting:
  - Centralized administration: Provides a single console for managing the entire Backup Exec environment, creates and delegates jobs to multiple Backup Exec servers, defines device and media sets.
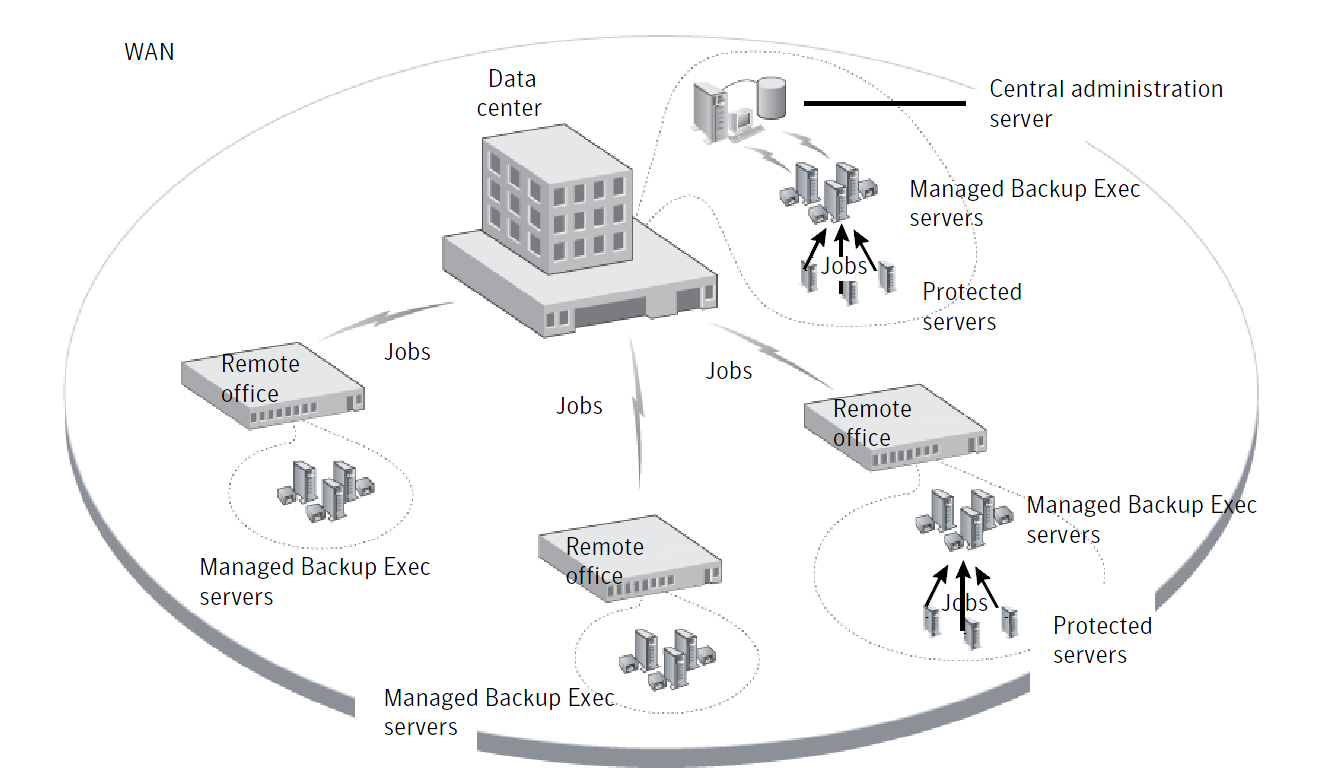
  - Typical CASO configured Backup Exec environment
    Centralized reporting: Monitors all job activity dispatched by the CAS in real time, provides holistic reporting for the entire storage environment, centrally defines notification and alert settings
  - Operational resiliency: Automatically load-balances jobs across multiple Backup Exec servers, provides job failover from one Backup Exec server to another, centralizes or replicates catalogs for restores.
  - Management Plug-in for VMware vSphere
  - Management pack for Microsoft System Center Operations Manager 2007 R2 & 2012 R2 (SCOM)
  - Management Plug-In for Kaseya
  - Localization/Language packs
  - Command Line Interface (BEMCLI)
- Media Management:
  - Automatic robotic/tape drive configuration
  - Broad tape device support
- Heterogeneous Support:
  - Broad platform support
  - Bare-metal restore, supports P2V as an option.
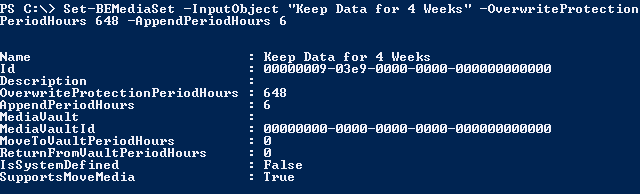
    Backup Exec Command Line Interface - BEMCLI
  - Support for leading networking topologies
  - Advanced VSS support
  - OpenStorage (OST) support
  - IPv4 & IPv6 support

=== Multiplexing limitation ===
Backup Exec does not have support for sending data streams from multiple parallel backup jobs to a single tape drive, which Veritas refers to as multiplexing. Their NetBackup product does have this capability.

Multiplexing can reduce backup times when backing up data from non-solid state sources containing millions of small or highly fragmented files, which require very large amounts of head-seeking using traditional mechanical hard drives, and which significantly slow down the backup process.

When only a single job is running, and the source server is constantly seeking at a high rate, the tape drive slows down or may stop, waiting for its write cache to be filled. These delays accessing data can cause the backup availability window to be exceeded, when multiple servers with slow transfer rates are being backed up one after the other to the tape device.

A workaround to this is to install temporary disk storage in the backup server to use as a cache for the backup process. This storage is split into hundreds of small 1-5 gigabyte data blocks. Backups to the data blocks can be done in parallel, and each of the separate disk-based backup jobs are configured to duplicate and append to tape when completed.

== Licensing ==
Backup Exec has the following licensing options:

- Capacity Edition - Deploy an unlimited number of Backup Exec servers, Agents and Options (Licensed per TB)
- Capacity Edition Lite - Includes protection for Windows and Linux operating systems, VMware and Hyper-V virtual environments, Microsoft applications, Oracle, and Enterprise Vault (Licensed per TB)
- V-Ray Edition - Protects an unlimited number of guest machines per host including all of the applications and databases (Licensed per occupied processor socket on the virtual host)
- Traditional - Licensing per Backup Exec server with Agents and Options available based on need

== Releases ==
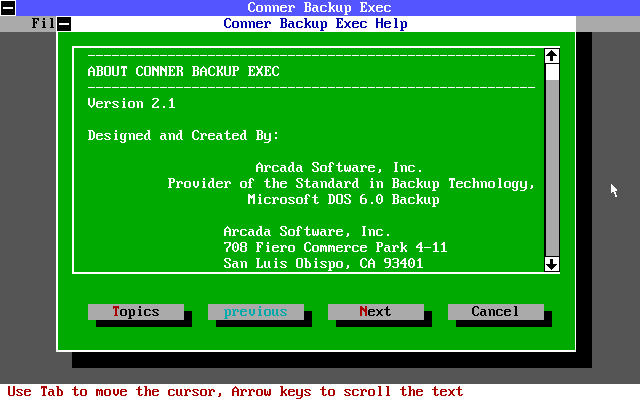
Conner Backup Exec 2.1 DOS version

- MaynStream for Windows 3.0, May, 1992
- Conner Backup Exec 2.1 DOS Version
- Conner Backup Exec for Windows NT 3.1, May, 1993
- Barney, Doug (June 1994). "Arcada Backup Exec will be bundled with Chicago". InfoWorld. 16 (24): 26.
- Arcada Software Backup Exec for Windows NT 6.0, April, 1995
- Seagate Software Backup Exec for Windows NT 7.0, August, 1997
- Seagate Backup Exec 7.2, October, 1998
- VERITAS Backup Exec 7.3, March, 1999
- VERITAS Backup Exec 8.0, January, 2000
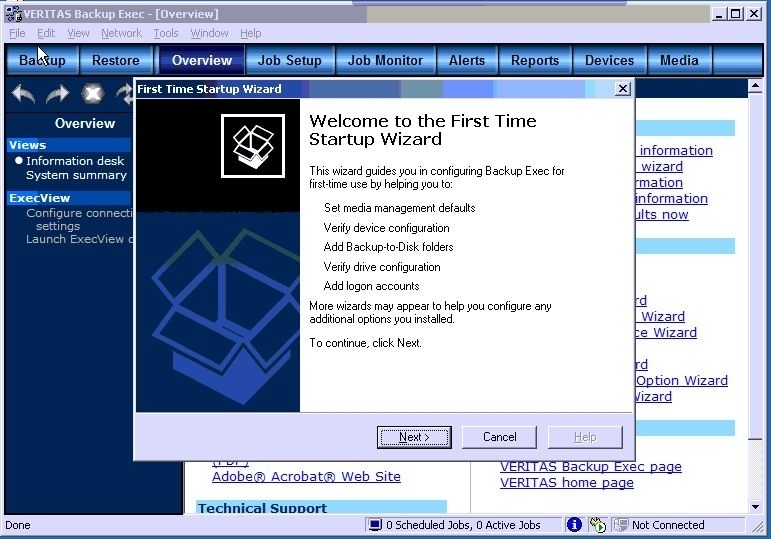
  Veritas Backup Exec 9.1
- VERITAS Backup Exec 8.6, November, 2001
- VERITAS Backup Exec 9.0, January 22, 2003
- VERITAS Backup Exec 9.1, November 4, 2003
- VERITAS Backup Exec 10.0, January, 2005
- Symantec Backup Exec 10d, September, 2005
- Symantec Backup Exec 11d, November, 2006
- Symantec Backup Exec 12, February, 2008
- Symantec Backup Exec 12.5, October, 2008
- Symantec Backup Exec 2010 (13.0), February, 2010
- Symantec Backup Exec 2010 SP1, August 16, 2010

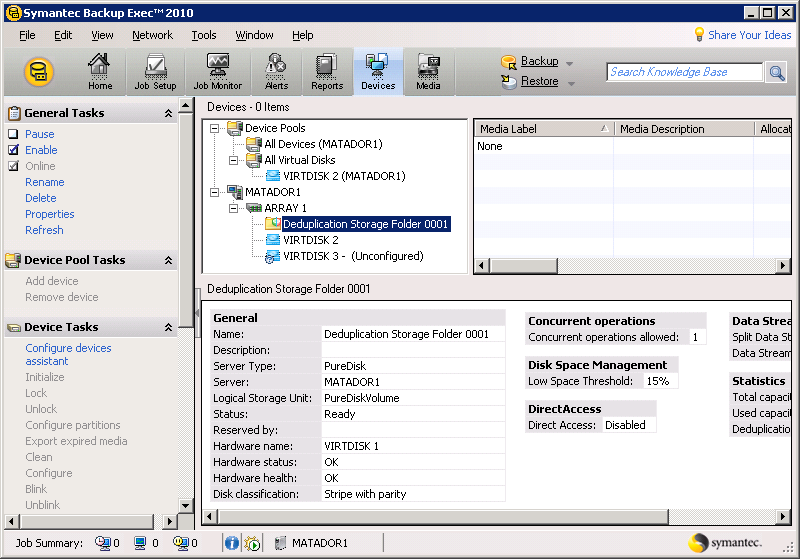
Symantec Backup Exec 2010 Administration Console

- Symantec Backup Exec 2010 R2, August 2, 2010
- Symantec Backup Exec 2010 R2 SP1
- Symantec Backup Exec 2010 R3, May 3, 2011
- Symantec Backup Exec 2010 R3 SP1, June 12, 2012
- Symantec Backup Exec 2010 R3 SP2, February 1, 2012
- Symantec Backup Exec 2010 R3 SP3, July 26, 2013
- Symantec Backup Exec 2010 R3 SP4, January 27, 2014
- Symantec Backup Exec 2012 (14.0), March 5, 2012
- Symantec Backup Exec 2012 SP1, June 1, 2012
- Symantec Backup Exec 2012 SP2, July 26, 2013
- Symantec Backup Exec 2012 SP3, November 21, 2013
- Symantec Backup Exec 2012 SP4, March 13, 2014
- Symantec Backup Exec 2014, (14.1), June 2, 2014
- Symantec Backup Exec 2014 SP1, September 22, 2014
- Symantec Backup Exec 2014 SP2, December 15, 2014
- Symantec Backup Exec 15, (14.2 Rev 1180), April 6, 2015
- Symantec Backup Exec 15 FP1, July 8, 2015
- Symantec Backup Exec 15 FP2, October 19, 2015
- Symantec Backup Exec 15 FP3, December 9, 2015
- Veritas Backup Exec 15 FP4, April 18, 2016
- Veritas Backup Exec 15 FP5, August 1, 2016
- Veritas Backup Exec 16, November 7, 2016
- Veritas Backup Exec 16 FP1, April 4, 2017
- Veritas Backup Exec 16 FP2, July 31, 2017
- Veritas Backup Exec, November 7, 2017
- Veritas Backup Exec (20.1), April 2, 2018
- Veritas Backup Exec (20.2), August 13, 2018
- Veritas Backup Exec (20.3), October 23, 2018
- Veritas Backup Exec (20.4), May 6, 2019
- Veritas Backup Exec (20.5), Sep 02, 2019
- Veritas Backup Exec (20.6), Dec 02, 2019
- Veritas Backup Exec (21), Apr 06, 2020
- Veritas Backup Exec (21.1), Sep 06, 2020
- Veritas Backup Exec (21.2), Mar 01, 2021
- Veritas Backup Exec (21.3), Sep 06, 2021
- Veritas Backup Exec (22.0), Jun 06, 2022

== See also ==
- Backup
- List of backup software
- NetBackup
- Veritas Software
