= Crystal Analysis =

Crystal Analysis (a.k.a. Crystal Analysis Professional) is an On Line Analytical Processing (OLAP) application for analysing business data originally developed by Seagate Software.

It was first released under the name Seagate Analysis as a free application written in Java released in 1999. After disappointing application performance, a decision was made to rewrite using ATL COM in C++. The initial rewrite only supported Microsoft Analysis Services, but support for other vendors soon followed, with Holos cubes in version 8.5, Essbase, IBM Db2 and SAP BW following in later releases. The web client was rewritten using an XSLT abstraction layer for the version 9.0 release, with better standards compliance to support Mozilla based browsers, this work also set the building blocks for support for Safari.

Crystal Analysis relies on Crystal Enterprise for distribution of analytical applications created with it.

== Release timeline ==
- Seagate Analysis 1999, by Seagate Software
- Crystal Analysis Professional v8.0, 29 May 2001 by Crystal Decisions
- Crystal Analysis Professional v8.1, Q4 2001 by Crystal Decisions
- Crystal Analysis Professional v8.5 9 July 2002 , by Crystal Decisions
- Crystal Analysis Professional v9.0 9 April 2003 , by Crystal Decisions
- Crystal Analysis Professional v10.0 8 January 2004 , by Business Objects
- Crystal Analysis Professional v11.0 31 January 2005, by Business Objects
- Crystal Analysis Professional v11.0 Release 2 30 November 2005, by Business Objects

Future versions will be released under the name, BusinessObjects OLAP Intelligence.
