= Arcada =

Arcada may refer to the following:

- Arcada Software, was a computer software company that was formed in early 1994.
- Arcada Theater Building, a Registered Historic Place in St. Charles, Illinois, USA.
- Arcada Township, Michigan, a civil township of Gratiot County in the U.S. state of Michigan.
- Arcada University of Applied Sciences, a university of applied sciences (polytechnic) in Helsinki, Finland.
