= Crystal Enterprise =

Crystal Enterprise is the Business Objects server-based delivery platform for Crystal Reports and Crystal Analysis originally developed by Crystal Decisions.

Crystal Enterprise is what is called a delivery platform in Business Intelligence terms. It provides an infrastructure for data access, which can store report templates. By using Crystal Enterprise, report designers can store report objects, instances of reports, schedule reports and request reports on demand through the use of clients, such as Web Browsers.

For example, an administrator could store a sales report on Crystal Enterprise, and schedule this report to be run at the beginning of every month. When the report is triggered, Crystal Enterprise would access the data sources specified in the report and save an instance of this report, which can be made available or automatically distributed to the relevant parties.

== Supported platforms ==
Due to the complexity of the Crystal Enterprise, many factors must be considered for platform compatibility, such as operating system, web server, application server, databases, and a combination of these factors. On the Crystal Enterprise installation CD, there is a text file called platforms.txt which covers every platform supported by Crystal Enterprise.

Crystal Enterprise can run in many different operating systems, such as Windows 2000 Server, Windows Server 2003, Solaris, Linux, AIX and HP-UX.

Newer versions of Crystal Enterprise provide several add-ons such as integration with Microsoft Office applications (such as Microsoft Excel) and SharePoint Portal Integration kit.

== Editions ==
Crystal Enterprise 11 was the last version, which was released after the acquisition of Crystal Decisions by Business Objects. This version was subsequently renamed Business Objects XI after adding Web Intelligence and Desktop Intelligence support.

Crystal Enterprise 10 had the following editions:

- Crystal Enterprise Express
- Crystal Enterprise Embedded Edition
- Crystal Enterprise Professional
- Crystal Enterprise Premium

== See also ==
- Business Objects
- CORBA
- Crystal Reports
