= Crystal Reports =

Business intelligence software

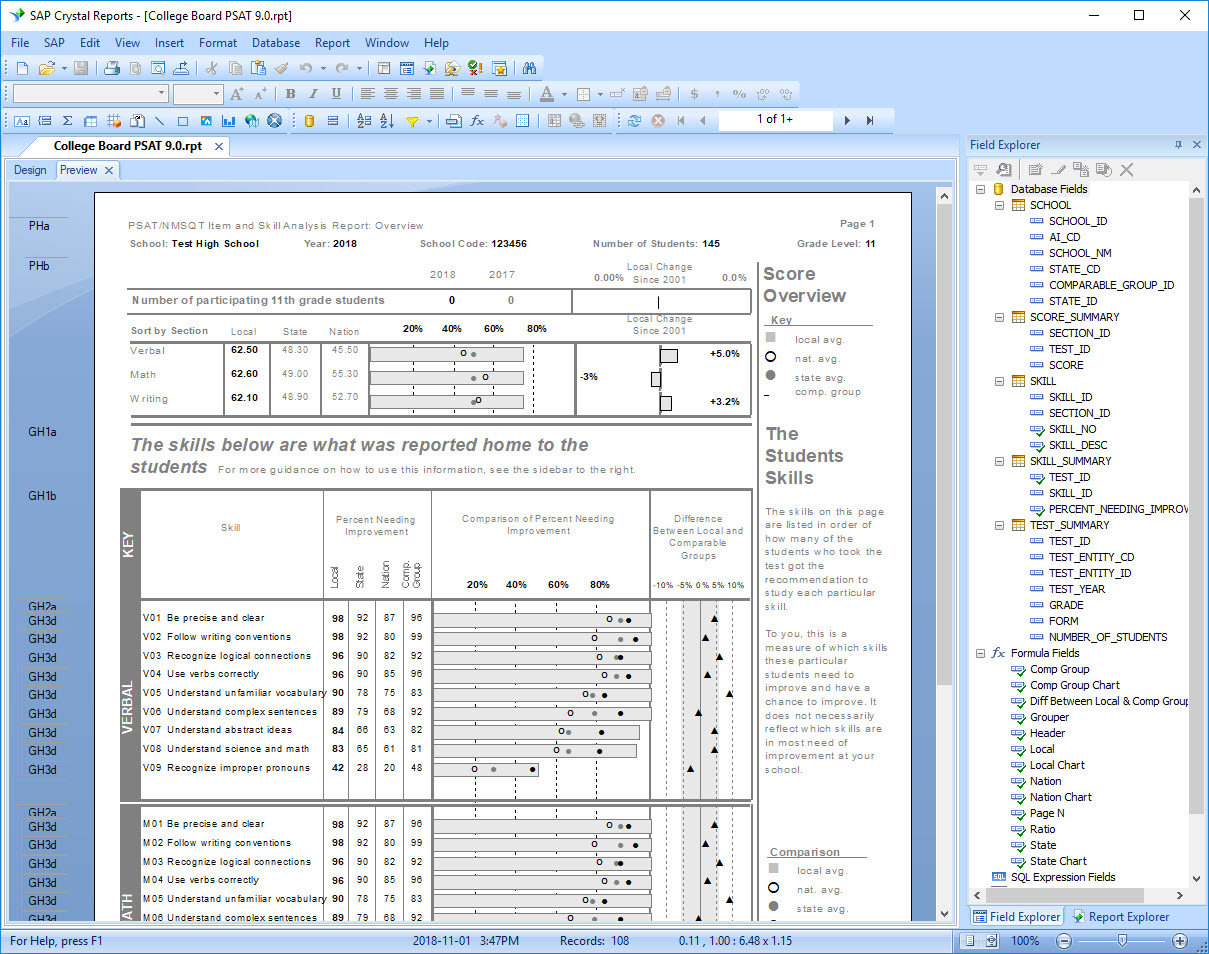
- Developer: SAP
- Operating system: Windows
- Available in: English; French; German; Japanese; Spanish; simplified Chinese; Italian; Dutch; Russian; Korean; traditional Chinese; Portuguese; Swedish; Polish; Danish; Norwegian; Finnish; Thai; Czech; Hungarian; Slovak; Turkish; Romanian; Slovenian; Arabic; Hebrew; Ukrainian; Kazakh
- Type: Reporting software
- License: Trialware
- Website: crystalreports.com

Crystal Reports is a business intelligence application marketed to small- and medium-sized businesses by SAP.

== History ==
Terry Cunningham and the Cunningham Group originated the software in 1984. Crystal Services Inc. marketed the product (originally called "Quik Reports") when they could not find a suitable commercial report writer for an accounting software they developed add-on products for, which was ACCPAC Plus for DOS (later acquired by Sage). After producing versions 1.0 through 3.0, Crystal Services was acquired by Seagate Technology in 1994. Crystal Services was combined with Holistic Systems to form the Information Management Group of Seagate Software, which later rebranded as Crystal Decisions and produced versions 4.0 through 9.0. Crystal Decisions was acquired in December 2003 by BusinessObjects, which produced versions 10, 11 (XI) and version 12 (2008).

SAP acquired BusinessObjects on October 8, 2007, and released Crystal Reports 2011 (version 14) on May 3, 2011. The latest version released is Crystal Reports 2025 (14.4.x) on March 12, 2025.

The file extension for Crystal Reports' proprietary file format is .rpt. The design file can be saved without data, or with data for later viewing or sharing. Introduced with the release of Crystal Reports 2011 (version 14.0), the read-only .rptr file extension option allows for viewing, but cannot be modified once exported.

Several other applications, including Microsoft Visual Studio versions 2003 through 2008, and Borland Delphi, at one time bundled an OEM version of Crystal Reports as a general purpose reporting tool. Microsoft discontinued this practice and later released their own competing reporting tool, SQL Server Reporting Services (SSRS).

== Versions and editions ==
Version	Release date	Ownership	Edition
1		Crystal Services	
2	1992	Crystal Services	
3	1994	Crystal Services	
4	1995	Crystal Decisions	
5	1996	Crystal Decisions	
6	1997	Crystal Decisions	
7	1998	Crystal Decisions	
8	2000	Crystal Decisions	D, P, S
8.5	2001	Crystal Decisions	A, D, P, S
9	2002	Crystal Decisions	A, D, P, S
10	2003	BusinessObjects	A, D, P, S
XI (11)	2004	Business Objects	D, P, S
XI R2 (11.5)	Nov 24, 2005	Business Objects	D, P, S
2008 (12)	Mar 31, 2008	Business Objects	D
2011 (14.0.x)	Aug 31, 2011	SAP	D
2013 (14.1.x)	Aug 29, 2013	SAP SE	D
2016 (14.2.x)	Mar 08, 2016	SAP SE	D
2020 (14.3.x)	June 13, 2020	SAP SE	D
2025 (14.4.x)	March 12, 2025	SAP SE	D

- A=Advanced Developer, D=Developer, P=Professional, S=Standard

== See also ==
- Dashboard (business)
- List of reporting software
- Jasper Reports

== Bibliography ==
- G. Taylor, Allen (June 3, 2008). Crystal Reports 2008 For Dummies (1st ed.). For Dummies. p. 396. ISBN 978-0-470-29077-4.
- Peck, George (June 19, 2008). Crystal Reports 2008: The Complete Reference (1st ed.). McGraw-Hill Osborne Media. p. 968. ISBN 978-0-07-159098-3.
- McCoy, Cate; Maric, Gord (2002). Mastering Crystal Reports 9 (1st ed.). Sybex. p. 639. ISBN 0-7821-4173-0. Archived from the original on 2010-11-25.
