= Quest Development =

American software development company

Quest Development Corporation was a privately held software development company founded in 1986 by serial entrepreneur Kevin Azzouz and ex-IBM executive Lennart Mengwall from Azzouz's garage in San Luis Obispo, California. Azzouz began developing a storage management and backup platform after his early purchase of a Rodime hard drive failed in 1983 resulting in the loss of important data.

Upon completion of the first fully functional version of his platform, Azzouz licensed it to Peter Norton Computing as The Norton Backup and then subsequently to Microsoft as Windows 3.1 and Windows NTBackup.

Peter Norton Computing was acquired by Symantec in 1990.

Quest retained exclusive ownership of all source code it developed, while Symantec retained exclusive marketing rights over the software. To provide a backup solution for the Norton Utilities for Macintosh suite, Quest acquired FastBack for Macintosh from Fifth Generation Systems, bringing its principal author, Tom Chappell, into Quest as part of the transaction. The relationship between Fifth Generation Systems and Quest was not always harmonious; it spawned litigation, with Quest prevailing after the discovery process led to dismissal by the court.

In January 1993, Quest paid Symantec to terminate their partnership agreements.

Azzouz terminated the Quest relationship with Symantec due to disagreements with Gordon Eubanks, CEO at Symantec, over the best strategy for becoming the industry standard as growth of PC hard drives was explosively scaling. Quest completed the separation from Symantec then immediately licensed their product suite to several tape drive and optical drive vendors, a step that generated substantial revenue.

The proven revenue growth allowed Quest to seek venture capital enabling Azzouz to quickly secure a significant investment from Conner Peripherals, the largest hard drive and tape drive manufacturer. Quest used the exclusive agreement with Conner to provide storage management software for all Conner storage devices which created exponential revenue growth. As part of the Conner investment, Quest completed the acquisition of Conner's software division, and the expanded company was renamed Arcada Software with Conner Peripherals owning controlling interest.

By 1995 Arcada's Backup Exec and full suite of storage management products became the global industry standard for both desktop and network server platforms like Windows NT, IBM OS/2 and Novell Netware.

In 1996 Arcada Software was acquired by Seagate Technology as part of their software company acquisition growth strategy with Kevin Azzouz named as President of Seagate Software.

Upon completion of Arcada's transition as Seagate Software, Azzouz launched development of internet technologies which led to him to join Mengwall in acquiring controlling interest in OneWave shortly after their IPO led by Goldman Sachs.
