= Nsite Software =

American platform as a service company

Nsite
- Industry: Computer software
- Founded: 1998
- Headquarters: Pleasanton, California
- Key people: Paul Tabet; (Founder); Alf Goebel; (CEO, 2002-2004); Bob Jandro; (President/CEO, 2004-2005); Kelly Nicholas; (VP Finance); Ryan Nagahori; (Co-Founder); Robert Brown; (Product Management); Jin Huang; (Architect); Colin Burns; (Engineer)
- Products: Quote and Proposal Management, Channel Management, Custom Development Platform, Smart Forms
- Revenue: $0 USD (2009)
- Number of employees: 0 (as of 2008)
- Website: Official website

Nsite (a.k.a. nsite.com, Nsite Software) was a platform as a service company based in the Bay area, specializing in Sales Force enhancements. Although several pre-built applications were offered on the platform, the most promising part of Nsite was the ability for a customer to use the product to develop their own application using a simple Internet-based interface. Since 2006, it has been a part of SAP Business Objects. The company claimed more than 27,000 customers worldwide when acquired by SAP Business Objects in November 2006. Its flagship product is the subscription-based Nsite platform, with components that provide quote to proposal, order management, and a custom development platform with an AJAX front-end and a MS-SQL backend.

== History ==
Paul Tabet, founder of Nsite in 1998 together with others and was a chief executive officer until 2002.

In 2002, Alf Goebel was announced as CEO. Two years later, Bob Jandro was announced as the new CEO. Nsite grew to 27,000 customers at the height of its success, then started a downward spiral shortly after the SAP Business Objects acquisition.

Finally, it met its end in 2010, when it was announced for retirement.

== Timeline ==
- 1998: Nsite launched in Paul Tabet's garage
- 2002: Alf Goebel named new CEO
- 2004: Bob Jandro named new CEO, Nsite secures $6M in B round funding
- 2005: Nsite secures $4M in C round funding. Moves product from Smart Forms to AJAX Announces partnership with WebEx.
- 2006: SAP Business Objects acquires Nsite for an undisclosed amount, touts SVP Steven Lucas
- 2006/7: SAP Business Objects moves managed hosting from IBM to OpSource.
- 2010: SAP Business Objects announces retirement of Nsite platform as January 31, 2011.
