= MTF =

MTF may refer to:

- Magnetized target fusion
- Male-to-female, a transgender woman
- Microsoft Tape Format
- Ministerial Taskforce on Indigenous Affairs, Australia, since 2004
- Mobile Task Force, of the SCP Foundation
- Modulation transfer function, an optical transfer function
- Monitoring the Future, a study of drug use
- Mordenkainen's Tome of Foes, a supplement for the 5th edition of the roleplaying game Dungeons & Dragons
- Move-to-front transform, a data encoding
- Postal code for Mtarfa, Malta
- Multilateral trading facility, an EU term
- Myocardial depressant factor
- Mario Tennis Fever, a Nintendo Switch 2 video game

== See also ==
- MFT (disambiguation)
