= Data integrator =

Data Integrator can refer to software used to integrate data, or to a person or company who integrates data:

- Pervasive Data Integrator, software
- SAP BusinessObjects Data Integrator, software
- Oracle Data Integrator, software
- EDI, EZMID Data Integrator, software
- Systems integrator, person or company

== See also ==
- Data integration
- Enterprise application integration
- Comparison of business integration software
