= Kennedy Company =

American computer storage company

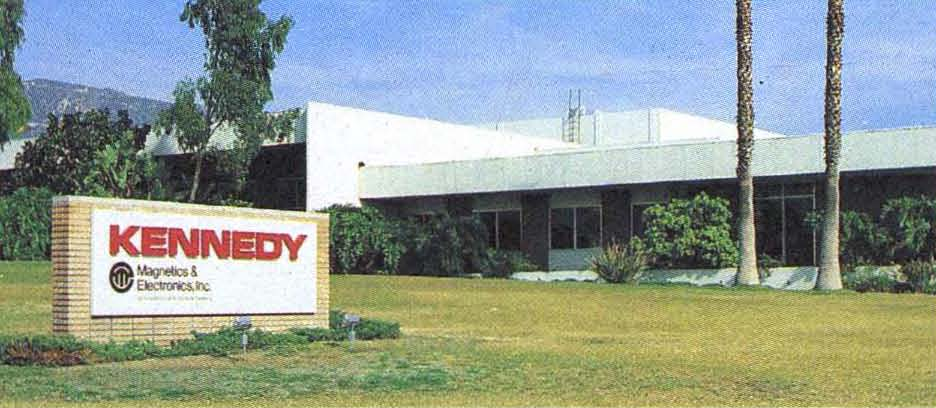
- Headquarters in Monrovia, California, pictured in 1982
- Type: Private
- Founded: 1963; 63 years ago in Altadena, California, United States
- Founder: Charles J. Kennedy
- Defunct: 1988; 38 years ago
- Fate: Dissolution; assets sold to Irwin Magnetic Systems
- Products: Magnetic-tape data drives; Hard disk drives
- Number of employees: 1,200 (mid-1980s, peak)
- Parent: Allegheny Ludlum (1979–1987); Shugart Corporation (1987–1988)

Kennedy Company, often shortened to Kennedy Co., was an American computer storage company active from 1963 to 1988. Founded by Charles J. Kennedy (1920–1996) and based in the Greater Los Angeles area, the company was one of the largest independent manufacturers of magnetic-tape data drives for mainframe and minicomputer users. Beginning in the late 1970s, the company also manufactured hard disk drives. In 1979, Kennedy was acquired by Allegheny Ludlum, where it continued to operate independently as a subsidiary. In 1987, it was acquired by Shugart Corporation, who promptly sold off Kennedy's assets to Irwin Magnetic Systems.

== History ==
=== Foundation (1963–1972) ===
Kennedy Company was founded by Charles J. Kennedy (1920–1996). Before founding his company, Kennedy served as a major in the U.S. Air Force in World War II, setting up a VHF radio transmitter at the Burma Road that helped the Allies supply materiel to China in their efforts against Imperial Japan. After his service, Kennedy worked for Collins Radio in Cedar Rapids, Iowa, building navigational systems for the military; RCA in Camden, New Jersey, developing mainframe systems; and F. L. Mosley (later acquired by Hewlett-Packard) in Pasadena, California, designing plotters. In 1963, he founded Kennedy Company in Altadena, California, initially to supply magnetic tape drives that recorded data onto tape in one direction (so-called incremental recorders), before moving onto tape drives with more complex transports that could read and write in a random-access fashion. Manufacturing was originally done at the company's Altadena headquarters, but some time later they moved all fabrication to a separate facility in nearby Glendale. Research and development was also eventually moved out-of-state, to Atlanta, Georgia. They also had an office in Pasadena.

One of Kennedy's first products, introduced in June 1963, was the Kennedy M201, an incremental recorder that could store up to 350,000 alphanumeric BCD characters onto standard 3M Scotch Quick-Load Cartridges (which were 3M's compatible version of RCA's Sound Tape Cartridge, with the M201 using the cartridges for data instead). By 1969, Kennedy was offering tape drives plug-compatible with IBM's 7-track and 9-track tape systems.

=== Growth and acquisition (1972–1978) ===
Before 1972, annual sales at Kennedy hovered around $3 million, remaining stagnant. In 1972, the company introduced the 9000 series of tape drives, which significantly improved access times over its predecessors, and began selling drives direct to customers as opposed to systems integrators. Helped by these developments, as well as their expansion into the quarter-inch cartridge market, sales grew to $10 million by 1975. The high cost of maintaining national service bureaus began eating into these increased profits, however, and in late 1974 they began winding down their direct-sales program, in favor of reverting to being an OEM. In July 1975, they began piloting expansion into other lines of peripherals, such as 8-inch floppy disk drives and chain printers.

Kennedy expanded heavily from the mid-1970s onward. The company opened up its first overseas office in the Netherlands in 1976. By 1977, Kennedy generated $16 million in revenue and had a market presence in Europe, Australia, Canada, India, Israel, Japan, and South Africa. In November 1977, Kennedy signed onto a ten-year lease to occupy Avon's former building in Monrovia, California. The initial terms of the lease let Kennedy occupy a 190,000-square-foot portion of the 340,000-square-foot building, with the property owners giving Kennedy the right to veto prospective tenants looking to occupy available space in the remaining 150,000 square feet. In December 1977, Kennedy moved its sheet metal fabrication and circuit board manufacturing operations from Glendale to a 35,000-square-foot building in Altadena, nearby their main headquarters. In April 1978, the company began manufacturing hard disk drives, leasing a 30,000-square foot facility in Azusa, California, to house the company's new Disk Division. The company's first hard drive products were Winchester-style 14- and 8-inch drives. The company also relocated their R&D to this facility from Atlanta.

Kennedy generated revenues of roughly $25 million in 1978. In October that year, Allegheny Ludlum of Pittsburgh, Pennsylvania, agreed to acquire Kennedy for an undisclosed sum. As part of the acquisition, Kennedy would be placed under Allegheny Ludlum's Magnetics and Electronics subsidiary. The acquisition concluded in March 1979. As a result of the acquisition, Kennedy consolidated their five California locations to their Monrovia facility, the company having expanded their lease there to 242,800 square feet.

=== Post-acquisition (1978–1990) ===
In July 1980, Charles J. Kennedy announced his retirement, while remaining on Kennedy's board of directors. He was replaced as president by Frank C. Bumb, who introduced the company's first dedicated data backup systems. By the end of 1980, Kennedy made between $45 million and $50 million in sales.

In 1982, Kennedy acquired the hard drive manufacturing lines, designs, and patents from BASF's American branch in Bedford, Massachusetts. As part of the same transaction, Kennedy acquired the license to manufacture BASF's 5.25-inch floppy disk drive designs in the United States.

Kennedy employed around 1,000 people in 1984. Employment peaked at 1,200 workers, including at a plant in Luquillo, Puerto Rico, opened up in the 1980s. The company's workforce eventually dwindled to 650 by 1987, and in September 1987, amid financial turmoil at Allegheny Ludlum, the latter sold Kennedy to Shugart Corporation for an undisclosed sum. While Shugart kept Kennedy around as a subsidiary for another year, they eventually dissolved the company and sold its assets to Irwin Magnetic Systems in 1988. Irwin themselves were acquired by Cipher Data Products in 1989, who themselves were acquired by Archive Corporation in 1990. All three were tape backup systems manufacutrers; Kennedy's patents were kept along from acquisition to acquisition, ultimately allowing Archive to leverage them against competitors with the threat of patent infringement suits around the turn of the 1990s.
