= Dimension Data =

MEA technology company

- Type: Private
- Industry: Information technology
- Founded: 1983
- Headquarters: Johannesburg, South Africa
- Area served: Global
- Key people: Alan Turnley-Jones (CEO), Barry Curtin (CFO), Jay Reddy (CDO)
- Services: Managed services; System integration; Consulting; Security; Education and learning
- Revenue: $7.5 billion (2014)
- Parent: NTT
- Subsidiaries: 17 subsidiaries: AccessKenya, AlwaysOn, ContinuitySA, earthwave, Euricom, Internet Solutions, JQ Network, Merchants, Nexus, NextiraOne, Oakton, Plessey, Security Assessment, SQL Services, Training Partners, Viiew
- Website: services.global.ntt

Dimension Data was a company specialising in information technology services. Based in Johannesburg, South Africa, the company maintained operations on every inhabited continent. Dimension Data focused on services including IT consulting, technical and support services, and managed services. The company was the official technology partner of the Tour de France, the Vuelta a España and also sponsored a team of the same name. In 2010, the company was fully acquired by Nippon Telegraph and Telephone (NTT). On 1 July 2019, all Dimension Data operations, excluding those in the Middle East and Africa, became part of NTT Ltd.

== History ==
Dimension Data was founded in 1983 by Keith McLachlan, Werner Sievers, Jeremy Ord, Peter Neale, and Kevin Hamilton. The company was listed on the Johannesburg Stock Exchange on 15 July 1987. Jeremy Ord was appointed as the company's executive chairman in that same year (a position he continued to hold as of 2016). In 1991, the company became the official South African distributor for Cisco Systems.

In 1993, the company expanded to Botswana, and, between 1995 and 1997, it began further expansion into the Asia Pacific region. In 1996, Dimension Data purchased a 45% stake in the Australian company, ComTech. It would later buyout the company fully in 2000. The company also bought a stake in the South African company, Internet Solutions, in 1996. Dimension Data would increase their stake in the company the following year. Also in 1997 the company purchased majority stakes in The Merchants Group and Datacraft.

Between 1998 and 2000, the company focused its expansion efforts on the Northern Hemisphere, investing in and acquiring a variety of companies in Europe, the United Kingdom, and the United States. One such acquisition was the 1998 purchase of London-based telecommunications company, Plessey. On 31 July 2000, Dimension Data was listed on the London Stock Exchange raising $1.25 billion in the process. By 2003, the company's revenue had jumped to $2 billion.

In 2004, Brett Dawson was appointed as CEO of the company and Jeremy Ord was appointed as Group Executive Chairman. Over the next 6 years, the company expanded in Africa, the Middle East, and South America. By September 2009, the company had an annual revenue of around $4 billion.

In July 2010, Dimension Data was acquired by Nippon Telegraph and Telephone (NTT) for £2.1 billion ($3.2 billion). In October of that year, NTT announced that Dimension Data would be delisted from both the Johannesburg Stock Exchange and the London Stock Exchange by the end of the year. Over the next few years, Dimension Data continued acquiring and integrating businesses like OpSource, NextiraOne, and Oakton.

In June 2016, Brett Dawson stepped down as CEO and was replaced by then COO, Jason Goodall. At the time, Dimension Data maintained 31,000 staff in 58 countries across all 6 inhabited continents. The annual revenue of the company was $7.5 billion.

On 1 July 2019, the majority of Dimension Data became part of NTT Ltd., along with NTT Security and NTT Communications. However, the brand continues to operate in the Middle East & Africa with Grant Bodley as CEO.

On 1 April 2021, Werner Kapp was appointed as CEO of the company, as Grant Bodley has resigned.

In June 2022, NTT announced the appointment of Alan Turnley-Jones to succeed Kapp as CEO.

In October 2023, it was announced that Dimension Data will become NTT Data, Inc. with effect from 1 April 2024. Alan Turnley-Jones will continue to lead the business in Africa and the Middle East.

== Acquisitions and subsidiaries ==
Dimension Data's current subsidiaries include AccessKenya Group, AlwaysOn, ContinuitySA, e2y Commerce, Earthwave, Euricom, Internet Solutions, JQ Network, Merchants, Nexus IS, Oakton, Plessey, Security Assessment, SQL Services, Training Partners and Viiew. Some of its early acquisitions included Australian companies, ComTech and Internet Solutions, in 1996. Merchants and Datacraft were acquired a year later. In 2000, the company purchased Plessey in a joint venture with WorldWide African Investment Holdings. SQL Services was acquired in 2008.

After Nippon Telegraph and Telephone purchased the company in 2010, Dimension Data began adding more subsidiaries to the fold. These include e2y Commerce, a digital experience, commerce and marketplace consultancy for SAP CX (Hybris) and Mirakl, Earthwave, an information and communications technology specialist based in Australia and courses on cybersecurity under the umbrella of Dimension Data in 2013, AccessKenya, and Nexus IS in 2014. The Nexus acquisition nearly doubled Dimension Data's presence in the United States.

Other Dimension Data subsidiaries, like AlwaysOn and ContinuitySA, were first acquired by fellow subsidiary, Internet Solutions.

== Products and services ==
Dimension Data provides information technology products and services, such as those for data centers, security, network integration and management and Microsoft support. The company is placing its primary focus on four service areas. These include: digital infrastructure, hybrid cloud, workspaces for tomorrow, and cybersecurity.

In addition to offering the sale of physical data centers, it provides operation, management, transformation, and relocation of such data centers. Dimension Data also manages and operates servers and storage and provides backup services in case of damage or disaster. In 2016 in association with the Amaury Sports Organization, Dimension Data overhauled the digital infrastructure for the Tour de France. The company added big data upgrades that allowed for new technologies like data capture, race coordination, improved graphics, and analytics.

=== Hybrid cloud ===
Dimension Data provides both public and private cloud computing servers. They also offer a hybrid cloud in which customers can choose which resources are public or private. Data can be stored on a customer's own servers or Dimension Data's servers. The company operates locations including Johannesburg, Sydney, and London.

=== Cybersecurity ===
Dimension Data provides cybersecurity for businesses on an enterprise scale. This includes infrastructure security, governance and compliance, risk assessment, and a variety of other cybersecurity services. It also offers services for mobile security and data leakage prevention.

=== Managed Networking and Collaboration ===
Dimension Data offers managed networking and collaboration which support SD-WAN, SASE, LAN, edge networking and cloud voice.

== Recognition ==
In March 2013, Dimension Data was named as a Leader in the Green Quadrant Sustainable Technology Services report by Verdantix. Dimension Data was named along with seven other companies as having a dedicated sustainability practice, a wide range of capabilities, and a strong track record in corporate sustainability. In April 2015, Dimension Data was honored with three separate Cisco Partner of the Year awards in three different regions. The following year, the company won the 2016 Microsoft Country Partner of the Year Award for Rwanda and Tanzania regions along with the Communications Partner of the Year and Cloud Productivity Partner of the Year in the Global arena.

== Cycling ==
On 3 May 2015, the Amaury Sports Organisation (ASO) signed a five-year deal with Dimension Data for Dimension Data to be the official technology partner on cycling events. As part of this deal, Dimension Data provides telemetrics including GPS positioning and speed in real time. In September 2015, the company also became the sponsor of the former MTN-Qhubeka becoming Team Dimension Data for Qhubeka.
