= Physical-to-Virtual =

In computing, a physical-to-virtual (abbreviated P2V or p-to-v) migration is the process of moving a physical server's operating system (OS), applications, and data to a virtual machine hosted on a virtualized platform.

== Methods of P2V migration ==
=== Manual P2V ===
User manually creates a virtual machine in a virtual host environment and copies all the files from OS, applications and data from the source machine.

=== Semi-automated P2V ===
Performing a P2V migration using a tool that assists the user in moving the servers from physical state to virtual machine.

- Microsoft's Virtual Server 2005 Migration Toolkit, HOWTO: Guideline for use Virtual Server Migration ToolKit (KB555306)
- VMware provides a semi-automated tool called VMware vCenter Converter for moving physical servers running Windows or Linux into virtual environments while they are powered on. VMware vCenter Converter replaces two older utilities: Importer (bundled with VMware Workstation) and P2V Assistant.
- Oracle's Virtual Box has a Linux-based tool which allows the conversion of a dd image of an existing hard drive
- Microsoft provides the SysInternals disk2vhd utility for making images from Windows XP or later systems to be used with Windows Virtual PC, Microsoft Virtual Server or Hyper-V.
- openQRM, an open-source datacenter management platform, does P2V (and V2P, V2V or P2P).
- Storix's bare-metal recovery product (System Backup Administrator) provides P2V and V2P capabilities for Linux, AIX, and Solaris.

=== Fully automated P2V ===
Performing a P2V migration using a tool that migrates the server over the network without any assistance from the user.

- Veritas Backup Exec has Physical to Virtual (P2V) conversion (and V2P) feature build into the backup engine which can be used for migrations or instant recovery
- vContinuum vContinuum by InMage systems is an automated P2V data protection/migration tool
- Symantec System Recovery enables fast, automated P2V and V2P conversions
- Quest vConverter is an example of a fully automated migration tool for P2V.
- System Center Virtual Machine Manager SCVMM among many other capabilities has P2V capability.
- Leostream is an example of a fully automated migration tool for P2V.
- PlateSpin Migrate is an example of a fully automated migration tool for P2V (and V2P, V2V or P2P).
- Virtuozzo contains automatic P2V (and V2P) migration tools.
- SanXfer by InQuinox is an automated server and data migration tool for P2V, V2P, and P2P with complete (server and storage) hardware independence.
- SureEdge, migrator by sureline systems is fully automated server data migration tool for p2v, V2vLinux and windows server migration, applications, i.e. Ms SQL server, oracle with complete hardware independence, cloud independent from any cloud to any cloud migration.

== See also ==
- Physicalization
