= OpSource =

- Logo from 2007
- Type: Private company
- Industry: Hosting, Cloud computing
- Founded: May 2002
- Headquarters: Santa Clara, California
- Key people: John Rowell (CTO); Treb Ryan (CEO) Co-Founders; Steve Nola - CEO, Dimension Data Cloud Solutions
- Website: cloud.dimensiondata.com

OpSource, Inc. is a cloud and managed services hosting company headquartered in Santa Clara, California. The company also has offices in Ashburn, Virginia, Ireland and India, and data centers in California, Virginia and the United Kingdom. OpSource is now part of the ICT company Dimension Data which acquired OpSource in 2011 for their Cloud Business Unit.

== History ==
In 2002, Michael Piacente, Dan Rasmussen, John Rowell and Treb Ryan founded OpSource in Sunnyvale, California. The company initially began to provide application support to Microsoft's HotMail product and other customers.

In 2005 the term software as a service (SaaS) was becoming popular. OpSource began to focus on SaaS, helping ISVs focus on software development, marketing and sales. As part of this product OpSource created a SaaS Enablement product which helped ISVs (Adobe, Business Objects, BMC) take their product to market, created a SaaS Incubation program for small businesses. In 2006, OpSource launched the annual "SaaS Summit" conference held in the San Francisco area. Since 2010, the event has been renamed "All About the Cloud" and is presented in conjunction with the Software and Information Industry Association

In 2009, OpSource released a cloud computing service that bills on a utility computing basis.

OpSource received $56.5M in funding from Artiman Ventures, Crosslink Capital, Intel Capital, Key Venture Partners, NTT (Nippon Telegraph and Telephone Corporation) and Velocity. Mark Spagnolo (past CEO - UUNET, Flag Telecom, Universal Access, Metromedia Fiber Network) was chairman of the board.

OpSource acquired Dublin, Ireland based Lecayla Technologies in 2008. Founded in 2004, LeCayla Technologies' metering and billing services allowed ISVs to offer software applications on a utility, perpetual licensing or hybrid pricing basis.

On June 30, 2011, OpSource Inc. was acquired by Dimension Data Holdings, which named Steve Nola the CEO of Dimension Data Cloud Solutions, a new division that included OpSource.

== Business model ==
OpSource has two main products: managed hosting and cloud computing.

Managed hosting is a dedicated hosting service with support for multiple applications, operating systems and databases. Originally called "Optimal On-Demand", these services are designed to support the software as a service market. OpSource offers a 100% uptime guarantee to customers who host their applications with them under the managed hosting product.

Cloud computing is delivered as an infrastructure as a service offering. Cloud computing customers do not own the physical infrastructure, instead avoiding capital expenditure by renting usage from a third-party provider. They consume resources as a service and pay only for resources that they use under a utility computing model, paying only for the services that are consumed. OpSource Cloud offers a 100% network uptime and <1ms intra network latency guarantee. The OpSource Cloud product competes with similar offerings from Rackspace, Amazon, and IBM.

Both service levels receive support via the usual means - e-mail, telephone, and ticket systems - but they are designed to fit the needs of different businesses.

== Awards ==
2010 Always On - On Demand Top 100 Category Winner -
2010 Top 20 Coolest Cloud Vendors -
