= Shugart Associates =

American computer peripheral manufacturer

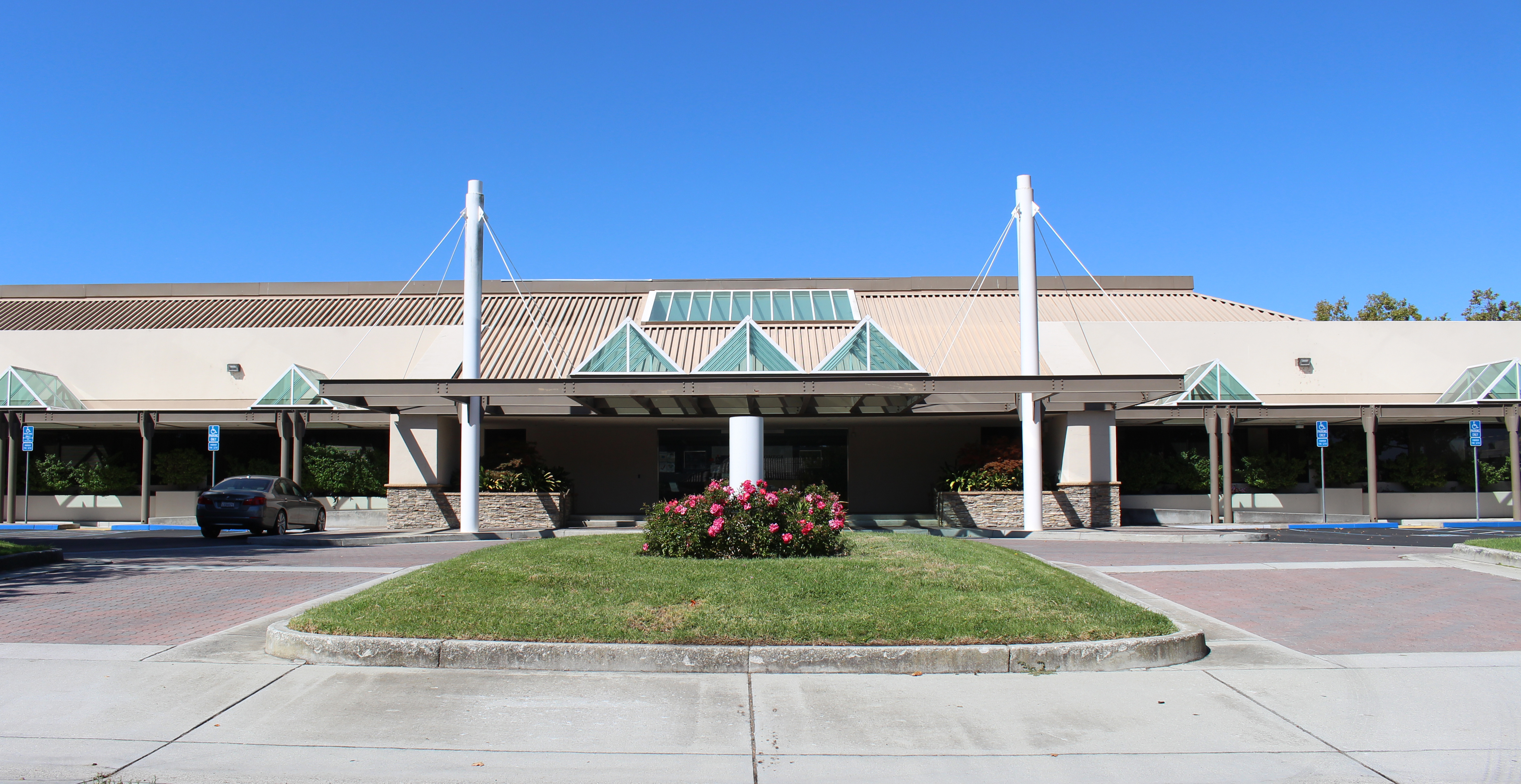
- Former headquarters in Sunnyvale, California
- Type: Defunct
- Industry: Computer hardware
- Founded: 1973
- Founder: Alan Shugart
- Fate: Acquired by Xerox in 1977 and liquidated in 1985 and 1986
- Headquarters: Sunnyvale, California, United States
- Area served: Worldwide
- Products: Floppy disk drives; Hard disk drives

Shugart Associates (later Shugart Corporation) was a computer peripheral manufacturer that dominated the floppy disk drive market in the late 1970s and is famous for introducing the 5 1/4-inch "Minifloppy" floppy disk drive. In 1979 it was one of the first companies to introduce a hard disk drive form factor compatible with a floppy disk drive, the SA1000 form factor compatible with the 8-inch floppy drive form factor.

Founded in 1973, Shugart Associates was purchased in 1977 by Xerox, which then exited the business in 1985 and 1986, selling the brand name and the 8-inch floppy product line (in March 1986) to Narlinger Group, which ultimately ceased operations circa 1991.

== History ==
=== Beginnings ===
After a distinguished career at IBM and a few years at Memorex, Alan Shugart decided to strike out on his own in 1973. After gathering venture capital, he started Shugart Associates. The original business plan was to build a small-business system (similar to the IBM 3740) dealing with the development of various major components, including floppy disk drives and printers. After two years, Shugart had exhausted his startup money and had no product to show for it. The board then wanted to focus on the floppy disk drive, but Shugart wished to continue the original plan. Official company documents state that Shugart quit, but he himself claims that he was fired by the venture capitalists. Shugart went on with Finis Conner to found Shugart Technology in 1979, which was later renamed to Seagate Technology in response to a legal challenge by Xerox.

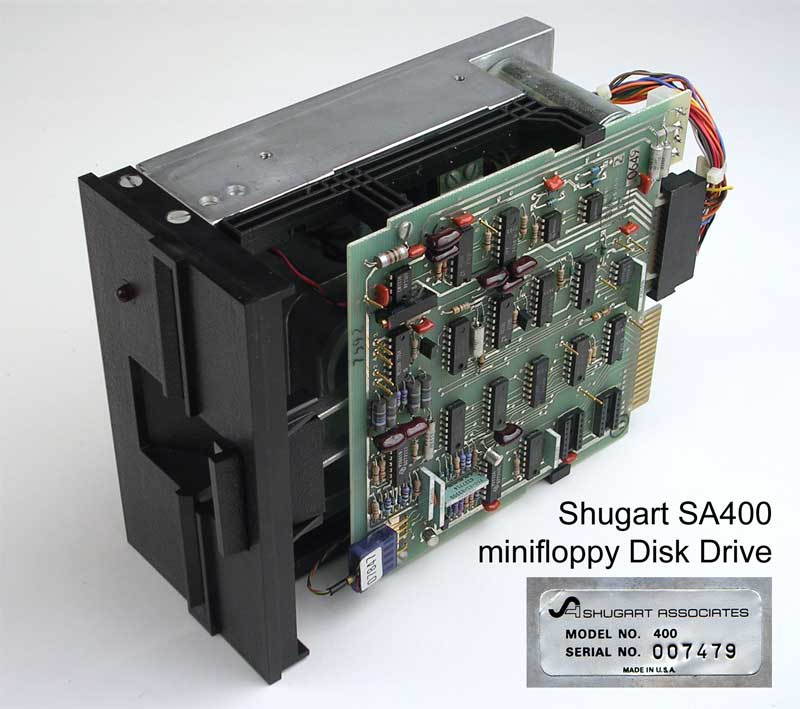
Shugart SA400 minifloppy 5 1/4-inch disk drive.

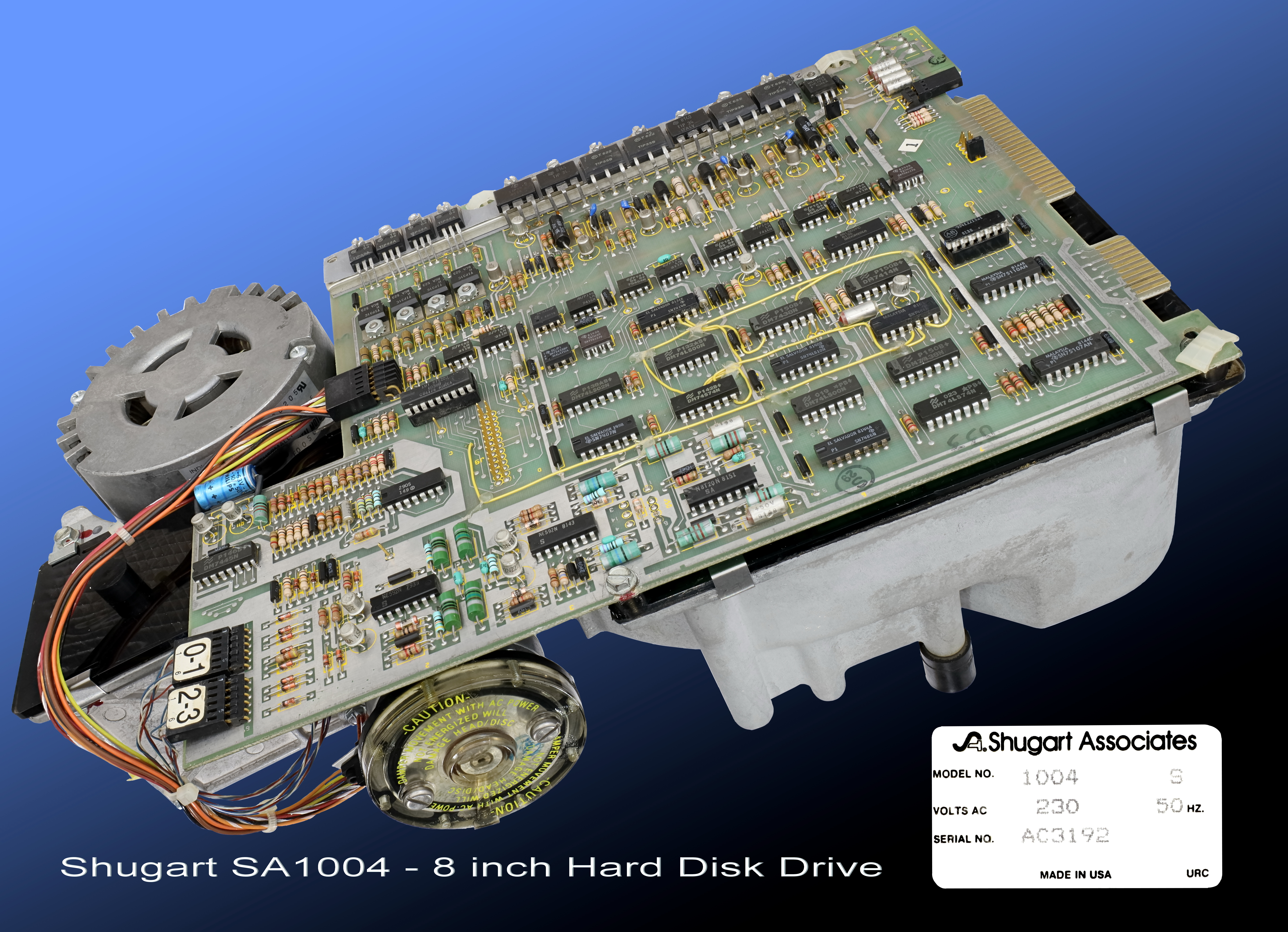
Shugart SA1004 – 10MB 8 inch hard disk drive.

The 5 1/4-inch floppy disk drive was introduced by Shugart in September 1976 as the Shugart SA400 Minifloppy (Shugart's trademarked brand name) at an OEM price of $390 for the drive and $45 for ten diskettes. The SA400 and related models became the company's best selling products, with shipments of up to 4000 drives per day.

The original SA400 was single-sided with 35-tracks and used FM (single density) recording. It could be used on either hard- or soft-sector floppy controllers and was specified at 80.6 kB with a soft sectored controller. The drive became the basis of the disk system on the Radio Shack TRS-80 Model I, Apple II, and many other early microcomputers.

=== Late 1970s ===
Xerox announced acquisition of Shugart Associates in August 1977 and completed its purchase that December at a price of about $41 million.

The 440 kilobyte SA450, a double-sided double-density 5¼-inch full height floppy disk drive was announced in December 1977 at $450.

In 1979, Shugart Associates introduced the "Shugart Associates System Interface" (SASI) to the computing world; the interface subsequently evolved into SCSI (Small Computer System Interface). The first standard process completed in 1986 with ANSI standard X3.131-1986 (popularly known as SCSI-1) as the result. Larry Boucher led the SASI engineering team; he and several of the engineers who worked on SASI left in 1981 to found host adapter maker Adaptec.

Also in 1979, Shugart Associates introduced the SA-1000, a series of hard disk drives that kept as many mechanical, electrical and formatting similarities as possible with its floppy-drive counterparts. Their physical dimensions, including mounting holes, were the same as an 8-inch floppy drive, making them some of the earliest hard drives compatible with a floppy drive form factor. By 1983, Shugart Associates had shipped over 100,000 such drives.

=== 1980s ===
In the early 1980s, in order to avoid development and start-up costs, the company turned to Matsushita Communications Inc., a subsidiary of Panasonic Corporation (then known as Matsushita Electric Industrial Co., Ltd), for its half-height 5 1/4-inch drives, sending that company on its way to becoming the largest floppy drive manufacturer in the world. In 1985, in order to resolve an inventory accumulation and as part of its exit strategy, Xerox gave up Shugart's exclusive rights to the Matsushita half-height 5 1/4-inch floppy drives. Shugart's eventual downfall came about partially as a result of the company failing to develop a reliable 80-track disk drive.

In 1983 the company changed its name to Shugart Corporation.

In late 1983, Shugart announced a "production-quantity optical drive", the Optimem 1000, offering 1 GB of storage on 12-inch disks using a laser-based recording technology, taking advantage of a substantially increased track density compared to contemporary magnetic recording technologies. The process of recording involved focusing the laser beam on the metal layer of the disk, this causing a "decomposable polymer" layer underneath to generate "gaseous components" and to push up on the metal layer, forming a bubble. This deformation would cause a change in the intensity of the reflected light from a laser reading the disk, thus providing a means of data storage. Initial OEM pricing for the drive was given as $6,000 per unit in 250-unit quantities with disks priced about $266 each (UK price). Disks with capacities of up to 3 GB were reportedly being developed. Optimem was sold to Cipher Data in 1986 who then discontinued operations in 1991.

Shugart's operating losses in 1984 along with Xerox's own troubles led Xerox to conclude in 1985 that Shugart businesses were no longer strategically important, resulting in a decision to close down Shugart rather than invest in recovery. Most of Shugart's businesses were shut down afterwards; however its floppy disk drive business was sold in March 1986 to Narlinger, which promptly rebranded itself as Shugart Corporation

Under the management of Narlinger, Shugart acquired several discontinued product lines such as Tandon's 8-inch floppy drives in 1986 and in 1988 bought the Optotech 5984 Write Once Read Many (WORM) drive and its manufacturing facility for less than US$4-million. In 1987, it acquired Kennedy Company, a maker of tape drives and hard disks, from Allegheny Ludlum. Shugart shortly after sold Kennedy's assets to Irwin Magnetic Systems, who promptly folded the Kennedy division while retaining its patents. Shugart themselves ceased operations around 1991.

== See also ==
- History of the floppy disk
