= Crystal Decisions =

American software company

Crystal Decisions (previously known as Seagate Software Information Management Group) was a company that was known for its business intelligence products.

The company was formed when hard disk drive manufacturer Seagate Technology acquired Holistic Systems and Crystal Services with the intention of pursuing better profit margins in the software market. Holistic Systems had a wide range of sales offices, infrastructure and the Holos OLAP product, whilst Crystal Services had good OEM deals for the Crystal Reports database reporting product that they had written. The first new product from the combined company was Seagate Info, which later evolved to become known as Crystal Enterprise. Crystal Analysis followed as an OLAP client.

The company's structure reflected its heritage, with OLAP technologies being developed out of the former Holistic Systems R&D site in Ipswich, Suffolk, England and Relational Database technologies being developed out of the former Crystal Services R&D centre in Vancouver, British Columbia, Canada.

Crystal Decisions was acquired by Business Objects in December 2003. As part of this acquisition, the former research and development site in Ipswich, Suffolk, England, was closed with a loss of about 80 jobs in order to centralize development in Vancouver and Paris, with the support for the Holos product being outsourced to Raspberry Software based near Ipswich.

The Holos product line has now ceased.

Business Objects was purchased by SAP in March 2008.
