= Holos (software) =

Online Analytical Processing product

Holos was an influential OLAP (Online Analytical Processing) product of the 1990s. Developed by Holistic Systems in 1987, the product remained in use until around 2004. The core of the Holos Server was a business intelligence (BI) virtual machine. The Holos Language was a very broad language in that it covered a wide range of statements and concepts, including the reporting system, business rules, OLAP data, SQL data (using the Embedded SQL syntax within the hosting HL), device properties, analysis, forecasting, and data mining. Holos Server provided an array of different, but compatible, storage mechanisms for its multi-cube architecture: memory, disk, SQL. It was therefore the first product to provide "hybrid OLAP" (HOLAP). The Holos Client was both a design and delivery vehicle, and this made it quite large. Around about 2000, the Holos Language was made object-oriented (HL++) with a view to allowing the replacement of the Holos Client with a custom Java or VB product. However, the company were never sold on this, and so the project was abandoned. Before its demise, the Holos Server product ran under Windows NT (Intel and Alpha), VMS (VAX and Alpha), plus about 10 flavors of UNIX, and accessed over half-a-dozen different SQL databases. It was also ported to several different locales, including Japanese.

== Company ==
Holistic Systems was purchased by the hardware company Seagate Technology in 1996. Along with other companies such as Crystal Services, it was used to create a new subsidiary company called Seagate Software. Only Holistic and Crystal remained, and Seagate Software was renamed to Crystal Decisions. Holistic and Crystal had very different sales models. The average sale for the Holos Product in the United States was in excess of $250,000 and was sold primarily to Fortune 500 companies by a direct sales force. The main Holos development team finally started to leave around 2000, and Crystal Decisions was finally taken over by Business Objects in 2004. Following the takeover, support for Holos was outsourced to Raspberry Software, which was set up by former employees of Crystal Decisions.
