= Irwin Magnetic Systems =

Former American computer manufacturer

Irwin Magnetic Systems, Inc.
- Formerly: Irwin International, Inc. (1979–1983)
- Type: Public
- Industry: Computer
- Founded: 1979; 47 years ago in Ann Arbor, Michigan, United States
- Founder: Samuel Irwin
- Defunct: 1989; 37 years ago
- Fate: Acquired by Cipher Data Products
- Number of employees: 600 (mid-1980s, peak)

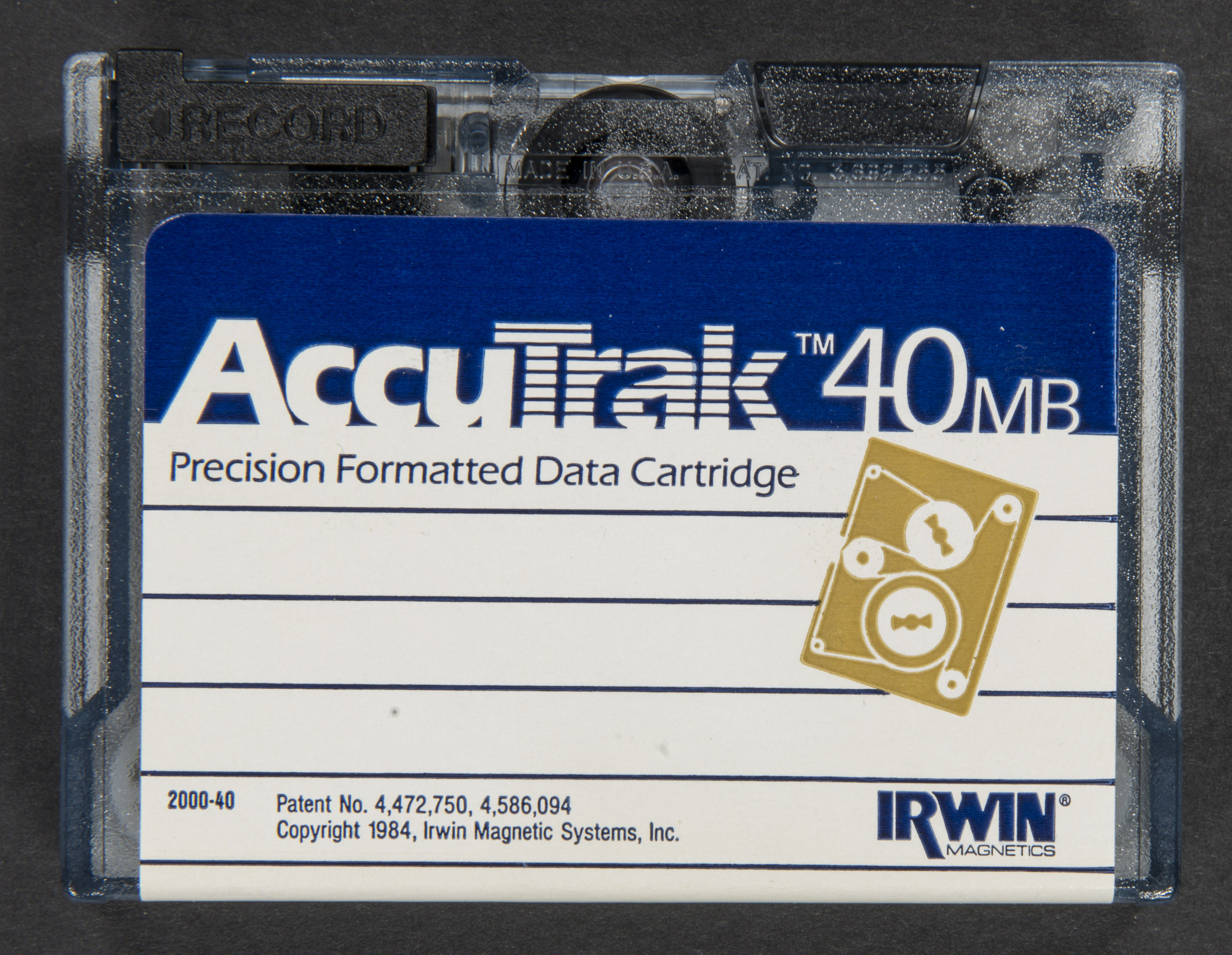
AccuTrak 40 MB tape cartdrige

Irwin Magnetic Systems, Inc., also known as Irwin Magnetics, was a computer storage manufacturer active from 1979 to 1989 and based in Ann Arbor, Michigan. It was founded by Samuel Irwin in 1979 as Irwin International, Inc. The company's primary export was magnetic tape data storage and backup systems for personal computers. Irwin was one of the first companies to manufacture quarter-inch cartridge (QIC) systems for the personal computer market. In 1989, the company was acquired by Cipher Data Products.

== History ==
Irwin Magnetic Systems was founded in 1979 as Irwin International, Inc., by Samuel Irwin. Irwin International spent the first few years of its existence developing a QIC–style magnetic tape data storage system, but the company was unable to develop a viable product.

In July 1983, Samuel Irwin transferred the assets of Irwin International into a separate holding company, Irwin Magnetic Systems. Unlike its predecessor, Irwin Magnetics was able to successfully develop a microcomputer tape system to market. Called the Irwin Backup, this system made use of 3M's DC100 tape format and was primarily intended as a means of backing up data. The Irwin was a commercial success, and the company soon inked deals with Compaq and NCR, personal computer manufacturers who resold the drives as value-adds for their machines. A few years later, Irwin introduced the AccuTrak, based on the then-common DC2000 tape cartridge format and featuring a proprietary embedded servo to increase data density. Initially sold exclusively for Macintosh computers, Irwin eventually released it for IBM PCs and compatibles, earning design wins from PC manufactures such as Compaq, Hewlett-Packard, and IBM, the latter of which sold them as an optional for their Personal System/2 (PS/2) line of PCs.

At its height in the mid-1980s, Irwin Magnetics employed 600 people in Ann Arbor. The company went public in 1986. In 1988, the company acquired Kennedy Company, a prolific tape drive manufacturer for minicomputer systems, from Shugart Corporation for an undisclosed amount. In 1989, Irwin was acquired by Cipher Data Products for US$77 million. Cipher was in turn acquired by Archive Corporation a year later. Archive maintained Irwin as an independent brand for a while after the acquisition.

== Noteworthy products ==
- EzTape – backup and restore software
- AccuTrak Plus – 120-MB and 250-MB tape drives
