= MFT =

MFT may refer to:

== Computers ==
- Managed file transfer, a technology that supports secure transfer of files within and among organizations
- Master File Table, an integral component of the NTFS file system
- Media Foundation Transform, a media processing plugin filter model in Microsoft Media Foundation
- Multiprogramming with a Fixed number of Tasks, an option of the OS/360 operating system
- Quarterdeck Manifest, a DOS system diagnostics tool by Quarterdeck Office Systems

== Other uses ==
- Manchester University NHS Foundation Trust
- Marble Freedom Trust, an American non-profit organization
- Marriage and Family Therapist
- Mean-field theory, in physics and probability theory
- Micro Four Thirds system, a lens mount for mirrorless interchangeable-lens digital cameras
- Moral foundations theory, a social psychological theory
- My Family Tree, WWE stable previously and currently known as The Bloodline

== See also ==
- MTF (disambiguation)
