= Inxight =

Inxight Software
- Type: part of SAP AG
- Industry: computer software
- Founded: (1997)
- Headquarters: Sunnyvale, California
- Key people: Ian Bonner, President and CEO
- Products: LinguistX, StarTree, Summarizer, ThingFinder, TableLens, TimeWall
- Revenue: US$14.6 million (2003)
- Number of employees: 100 (2005)
- Website: www.inxight.com - (moved to SAP web site)

Inxight Software, Inc. was a software company specializing in visualization, information retrieval and natural language processing. It was bought by Business Objects in 2007; Business Objects was in turn acquired by SAP AG in 2008. Founded in 1997, Inxight was headquartered in Sunnyvale, California. It was originally spun out of Xerox PARC.

== Products ==
Inxight offered text analysis products in the form of C++ libraries:

- LinguistX for the identification of stems, parts of speech, and noun phrases.
- Summarizer for the identification of key phrases and key sentences.
- ThingFinder for the identification of entities and grammatical patterns, such as "facts", events, relations, and sentiment. This was built on a proprietary pattern-matching language.
- Categorizer for matching a document to nodes in a taxonomy hierarchy.

And also visualization products:

- StarTree, a hierarchical and graph visualization/navigation tool.
- TableLens, a trend visualization tool for large data sets.
- TimeWall, an event/timeline visualization tool.

This functionality is now available via SAP Hybris YaaS Market and is embedded in various SAP platforms (such as SAP HANA and SAP Data Services).

== See also ==
- Computational linguistics
- Natural language processing
- Named entity recognition
