= John G. Schwarz =

Business executive and entrepreneur

- Born: September 15, 1950 (age 76); Canada
- Education: University of Toronto
- Occupations: Business executive and entrepreneur
- Known for: CEO of Business Objects and former executive at Symantec and IBM
- Children: 2 (Jan and Brett Schwarz)

John G. Schwarz (born September 15, 1950) is a Canadian business executive and entrepreneur. He is the founder and CEO of Visier Inc. and on the board of directors of Synopsys, Teradata, and Avast Software. He previously worked at IBM and was on the executive board of SAP AG and the CEO of BusinessObjects.

== Early life ==
John G. Schwarz attended the University of Manitoba where he received a BA in political science and a BSc in computer science. He also holds an executive MBA from the University of Toronto.

== Career ==
Schwarz was at IBM Corporation from about 1975 to 2000, where he became a general manager of a service unit.

Schwarz was CEO of Reciprocal Inc., a private e-commerce service provider to the media industry from January 2000 to November 2001 (mi2n.com, WSJ, Buffalo News). Schwarz was president and chief operating officer of Symantec Corporation from December 2001 through September 2005.

=== Business Objects ===
Schwarz was CEO of Business Objects S.A., a business intelligence software company, through its acquisition by SAP for $6.8 billion in January 2008. He began his tenure at Business Objects in September 2005 and remained CEO of the SAP Business Objects stand-alone unit through early 2010 when he resigned.

After the acquisition by SAP, he also served as a member of the executive board of SAP from March 2008 to February 2010.

=== Visier ===
In 2010, Schwarz co-founded Visier, Inc., a cloud-based software provider, with Ryan Wong (former senior vice president of engineering for the business intelligence platform at SAP SE) and sons Jan and Brett Schwarz.

Visier's workforce analytics and planning products were included in the Gartner "Cool Vendors in Human Capital Management Software, 2012" and the Branham 300 - Top Technology Companies in Canada in the "Top 25 Canadian UP and Coming ICT Companies" list. Visier was also a finalist in the Cloudbeat 2011 Showdown, a competition for start-up companies during the cloud-technologies focused conference.

On March 15, 2017, Visier completed their largest funding round to date, securing $45M USD from U.S. venture capital firm Sorenson Capital, joined by Foundation Capital, Summit Partners and Adams Street Partners.

On June 11, 2014, Visier announced $25.5 million in Series C financing led by Adams Street Partners and repeat investment from Foundational Capital and Summit Partners.

In 2013, Visier secured $15 million in Series B funding. Series B was led by investor group Summit Partners. Prior to that, Visier raised $6 million in its Series A round in 2011 using the funds to turn the self-financed prototype into a fully functional software product. Series A was led by investor group Foundational Capital.

=== Other roles ===
Schwarz served on the board of directors of Synopsys, Inc. since May 2007, Teradata since September 2010, and Avast since December 2011.

He is also a member of the Advisory Council at Dalhousie University in Halifax, Nova Scotia, Canada.

== Recognition ==
In May 2004, Schwarz received an honorary doctorate of law from Dalhousie University.

== Personal life ==
John G. Schwarz has at least two children, as sources state that Visier was co-founded with John Schwarz and his sons Jan and Brett Schwarz.
