= Arcada Software =

American computer software company

Arcada Software, Inc.
- Industry: Software industry
- Founded: 1994; 32 years ago in California, U.S.
- Defunct: 1996; 30 years ago
- Fate: Acquired by Seagate Technology
- Successor: Seagate Software
- Headquarters: U.S.
- Key people: Kevin Azzouz
- Products: Backup Exec, NTBackup

Arcada Software, Inc., was an American computer software company based in California.

== History ==
The company was formed in early 1994 by the merger of Conner Software (the software division of Conner Peripherals) in Lake Mary, Florida; and Astora Software (formerly Quest Development Corporation) in San Luis Obispo, California.

Conner Software owned the Backup Exec brand of backup software, while Quest owned the source code behind Symantec Corporation’s Norton Antivirus Backup for the DOS, Windows, and Macintosh computing platforms of the time.

Arcada was handling the backup applet for individual machines within Windows products since 1991. Seagate continued in that role after acquiring Arcada in 1996.

In 1995, Arcada Software acquired the Sytron division of Rexon, to become a leader in the OS/2 market as well.

The Chief Executive Officer of Arcada Software was entrepreneur Kevin Azzouz, also the founder and President of Quest Development Corporation.

In February 1996, Seagate Technology acquired a stake in Arcada.

== Fate ==
Arcada’s sales revenues grew exponentially over its two-year lifespan, until was acquired by Seagate Technologies in 1996.

Seagate then spun it and the other software companies it had acquired up to that time off into a wholly owned subsidiary called Seagate Software.

== See also ==
- NTBackup
- Software companies based in California
