= Embedded servo =

Embedded servo or wedge servo is a type of servo configuration used on hard disks. Embedded servo systems embed the feedback signals for the read/write head positioner (usually a voice coil motor) inside gaps (wedges) in the data tracks of the disk. This setup allows the entire set of platters to be used, instead of having to reserve one or two surfaces for the servo's use, which makes more space for data available on the drive. Embedded servo was originally developed in the 1970s, and started to appear on mass-market hard drives for personal computers in the late 1980s.

As with dedicated-servo drives, the control signals are written at the factory using a special device called a servowriter, and cannot usually be regenerated in the field. Drives with errors in the servo areas are considered to be badly damaged and should be replaced.
