= Leostream =

- Type: Private
- Industry: Technology;
- Founded: 2002
- Founder: David Crosbie
- Headquarters: Waltham, Massachusetts
- Services: Virtual Desktop Connection Broker
- Website: www.leostream.com

Leostream, founded in 2002, is a privately held technology company based in Waltham, Massachusetts. Its flagship product is a connection broker for virtual desktop infrastructure (VDI) and resources hosted in the datacenter.

== Software ==
Leostream develops a vendor-neutral connection broker, which is software that maps end users to computing resources, such as desktops, that are hosted in a data center. A connection broker integrates end-user access points, including thin clients, laptops and Web browsers, with back-end systems hosting desktops and applications. It also integrates all other data center systems required for a virtual desktop infrastructure, including security, authentication, and load balancing systems.

The Leostream Connection Broker provides a single interface to manage a range of operating systems, physical and virtual desktops, and display protocols commonly found in enterprise environments. Delivered as a virtual appliance, the Leostream Connection Broker supports the major hypervisors, including those provided by VMware®, Citrix®, Red Hat®, and Microsoft®. Leostream supports both Microsoft Windows and Linux operating systems in the datacenter. In addition, the Leostream Connection Broker is optimized for OpenStack® powered clouds and is a partner in the HPE Helion OpenStack program and is also SUSE OpenStack Certified.

Once installed, the broker is used to add desktop and application resources, define authentication servers, build pools and plans, and configure client and end-user policies. For purely physical environments, the Leostream Connection Broker is packaged as an ISO that can be installed on certain hardware.

Leostream supports over ten display protocols, including Teradici PCoIP, HP RGS, and OpenText Exceed onDemand, which are tailored for systems running graphic-intense applications. The Leostream Connection Broker is also used to deliver cloud/hybrid deployments and Desktop-as-a-Service (DaaS) with desktops hosted on AWS, Azure or OpenStack clouds.
