= Arcada University of Applied Sciences =

Institute of higher education in Helsinki, Finland

- Yrkeshögskolan Arcada
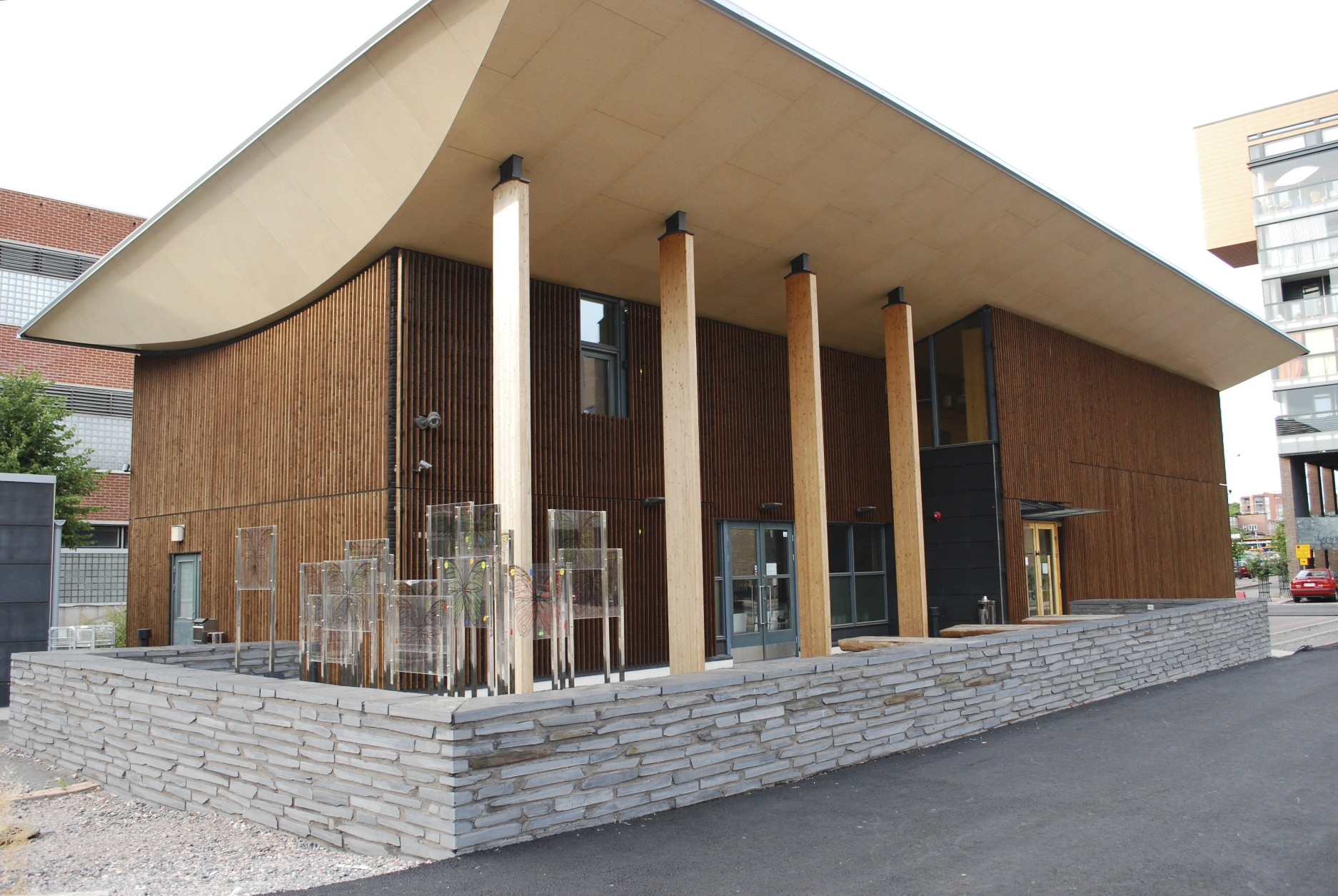
- Cor-huset, Arcada UAS student union's building
- Type: University of applied sciences (polytechnic)
- Established: 1996
- Endowment: 87 M€
- Rector: Mona Forsskåhl
- Students: 2,700
- Location: Helsinki, Uusimaa, Finland; 60°12′05″N 24°57′55″E
- Colors: White, black, purple
- Website: www.arcada.fi

Arcada University of Applied Sciences (Swedish: Yrkeshögskolan Arcada; Finnish: Ammattikorkeakoulu Arcada) is a Swedish-language university of applied sciences (a polytechnic) in Helsinki, Finland. It is owned and maintained by the Arcada Foundation.

== Characteristics ==
It offers classes mostly in Swedish, but also in English. Since 2004, it is located in the campus in Arabianranta, Helsinki. Before 2004, it was located in three campuses: two in Helsinki (in Alppila and Lauttasaari) and one in Espoo (in Pohjois-Tapiola).

The students' union is Arcada Student Union (ASK) which is a member of the Union of Students in Finnish Universities of Applied Sciences (SAMOK), Erasmus Student Network (ESN), the regional organisation Opiskelijan Uusimaa – Studerandes Nyland, and Swedish-speaking organisation Svenska Studerandes Intresseförening (SSI).

== History ==
Arcada was established in 1996 as a merger of the Swedish Institute of Health Care Education (Sjukis), the Swedish Institute of Commercial Education (Lilla Hanken), the Institute of Technology (Verket) and the Folkhälsan Institute of Social Education.

The Arcada Foundation holds various funds which contribute to the funding of Arcada university and other initiatives, including the deriving from a 1924 donation by Arvid Fabian Lindstedt (A.F. Lindstedts & Svenska handelsinstitutets fond för handelsutbildning).

== Studies ==
Arcada offers bachelor and master level programs and continuing education. Most courses can also be attended through open university. Most of Arcada's programs are Swedish-speaking, although there are 4 Bachelors and 4 Masters taught in English. There are programs in the fields of health care, culture and media, social services, business and technology. Majority of programs are full-time.

Arcada cooperates with other universities of applied sciences both internationally and domestically.
