= BusinessObjects Data Integrator =

Data integration software

Business Objects's Data Integrator is a data integration and ETL tool that was previously known as ActaWorks. Newer versions of the software include data quality features and are named SAP BODS (BusinessObjects Data Services). The Data Integrator product consists primarily of a Data Integrator Job Server and the Data Integrator Designer. It is commonly used for building data marts, ODS systems and data warehouses, etc.

Additional transformations can be performed by using the DI scripting language to use any of the already-provided data-handling functions to define inline complex transforms or building custom functions.

Data Integrator Designer stores the created jobs and projects in a Repository. However, Data Integrator Designer also facilitates team-based ETL development by including a Central Repository version control system. Although this version control system is not as robust as standalone VCSs, it does provide the basic check-in/check-out, get latest, version labeling and undo checkout functionality.

The DI Job Server executes, monitors and schedules jobs that have been created by using the Designer.

== Web Administrator ==
The DI web administrator is a web interface that allows system administrators and database administrator to manage the different repositories, the Central Repository, Metadata, the Job Server and Web Services.

- Scheduling, monitoring, and executing batch jobs
- Configuring, starting, and stopping real-time servers
- Configuring Job Server, Access Server, and repository usage
- Configuring and managing adapters
- Configuring and managing tools.

== Supported Platforms ==
Data Integrator runs on Windows platforms and under HP-UX (including 64-bit), Sun Solaris, AIX and Linux, while the repository, which supports the Common Warehouse Meta model, may be based on Oracle, DB 2 or SQL Server.
