= Microsoft Tape Format =

Tape format

Microsoft Tape Format (MTF) is the tape format used by several backup tools for the Microsoft Windows platform. Notable examples include Microsoft's NTBackup program, Backup Exec and the backup utilities included in Microsoft SQL Server.

Several open source utilities have been written to read MTF on non-Windows platforms.
