= Maynard Electronics =

- Industry: Magnetic tape data storage related products
- Founded: 1982; 43 years ago
- Founders: Kim and Alison Knapp
- Defunct: 1989
- Fate: Acquired by Archive Corp. then Conner Peripherals
- Successor: Backup Exec
- Headquarters: Lake Mary, Florida, United States

Early product logo

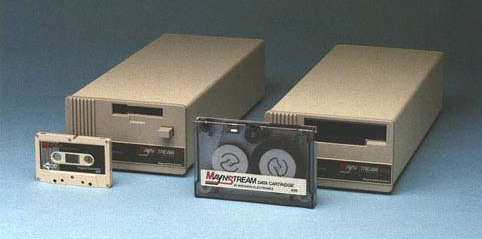
Two Maynard tape drives with media

Maynard Electronics was an American company based in Lake Mary, Florida that produced magnetic tape data storage related products.

The company was founded by Kim and Alison Knapp in 1982. It was acquired by Archive Corp. in 1989, but the brand was maintained. In order to make it easier to sell tape drives, the company created driver software that came to be called MaynStream. After Conner Peripherals acquired Archive, the software product was renamed Backup Exec.
