= Virtualization for aggregation =

Virtualization for aggregation combines physical servers and their memory and CPU power to create a single, large virtual machine.

Virtualization for aggregation is the opposite of traditional server virtualization, which partitions a single physical system so that multiple OSes can be run on the hardware. The technology is primarily used to run compute-intensive applications on a virtual symmetric multiprocessing (SMP) system, and can benefit users who want to provide very large memory and capacity resources for high-performance computing (HPC) needs without having to invest in proprietary SMP systems, which are beyond the reach of many users.
