= Cipher Data Products =

Defunct American computer company

Cipher Data Products, Inc.
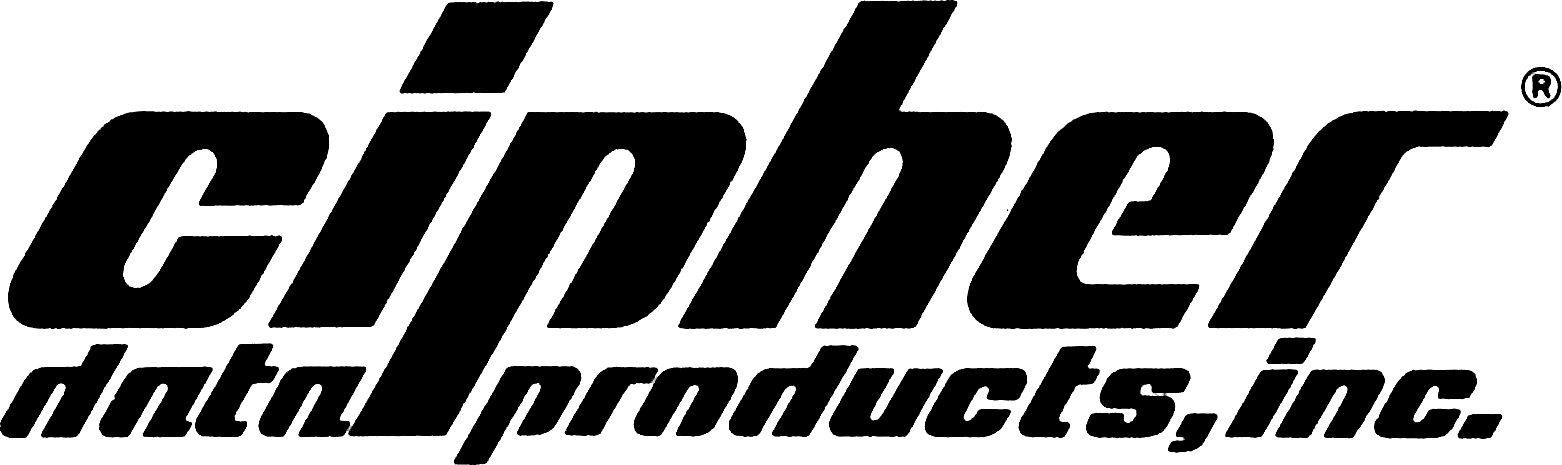
- Type: Public
- Industry: Computer
- Founded: 1968; 58 years ago in San Diego, California, United States
- Founder: Bill Otterson (co-founder)
- Defunct: 1990; 36 years ago
- Fate: Acquired by Archive Corporation; division shuttered in November 1992
- Products: Data storage
- Number of employees: 1,600 (1990, peak)
- Parent: Computer Machinery Corporation (1973–1976)
- Divisions: Irwin Magnetic Systems (1988–1990); Archive Corporation (1990–1992)

Cipher Data Products, Inc., was an American computer company based in San Diego, California, and active from 1968 to 1992. The company was once a leading manufacturer of magnetic-tape data drives and media for minicomputers, becoming a pioneer in tape streamer technology in the early 1980s. In the late 1980s, they also briefly manufactured WORM optical discs, through a joint venture with 3M. In 1990, they were acquired by Archive Corporation for $120 million.

== History ==
=== First independent era (1968–1973) ===
Cipher Data Products commenced operations in San Diego, California, in 1968. Cipher was principally co-founded by William "Bill" Otterson (c. 1931 – 1999), a 14-year veteran of IBM who got his start working on computer systems in the Air Force in the early 1950s. The company was initially funded by Sutter Hill Ventures of Palo Alto, California, a venture capital firm. Initially an executive of the company, Otterson was named chairman of Cipher in the summer of 1970.

Cipher began as a manufacturer of incremental recorders, or magnetic tape drives that recorded data onto tape in one direction only. In around late 1970, the company began expanding their offerings, releasing drives that could read and write data in a random-access manner through the use of more complicated transports.

Sales were dismal at first, with Cipher only reporting their first profitable year in 1970. Due to the company's lack of competitive proprietary offerings and insufficient capital investment, the company remained unable to make serious inroads in the highly competitive market for tape drives and media. One of their fiercest independent competitors at the time was Kennedy Company, a pioneer in the tape drive industry also based in Southern California, who were eventually acquired by Allegheny Ludlum.

=== Under ownership of Computer Machinery Corporation (1973–1976) ===
In 1973, Sutter Hill began divesting their shares in Cipher to the Computer Machinery Corporation (CMC) of Santa Monica, California, a maker of data entry equipment, starting in May 1973. They later sold Cipher to CMC outright in October that year. Under ownership of CMC, Cipher became CMC's in-house tape drive manufacturer. As well, they continued selling drives compatible with IBM and DEC minicomputers to outside customers. Cipher's manufacturing output during this time was split 85–15, between CMC systems and third-party systems.

The acquisition was initially a boon for Cipher, who saw increased profits, but it soon turned perilous when CMC themselves ran into financial difficulty in the mid-1970s. Otterson and three San Diego investors, including R. B. "Buzz" Woolley, attempted to buy back the company starting in 1975 but ran into resistance from CMC's executives. In 1976, Pertec Computer Corporation, then the top manufacturer of OEM tape drives, acquired CMC. Shortly after the acquisition, in 1976, Pertec accepted Buzz and company's $850,000 buyout offer, and the company was once again independent. Cipher rebounded in under a year, successfully filling the revenue gap formed in the loss of their CMC products.

=== Second independent era and success (1976–1985) ===
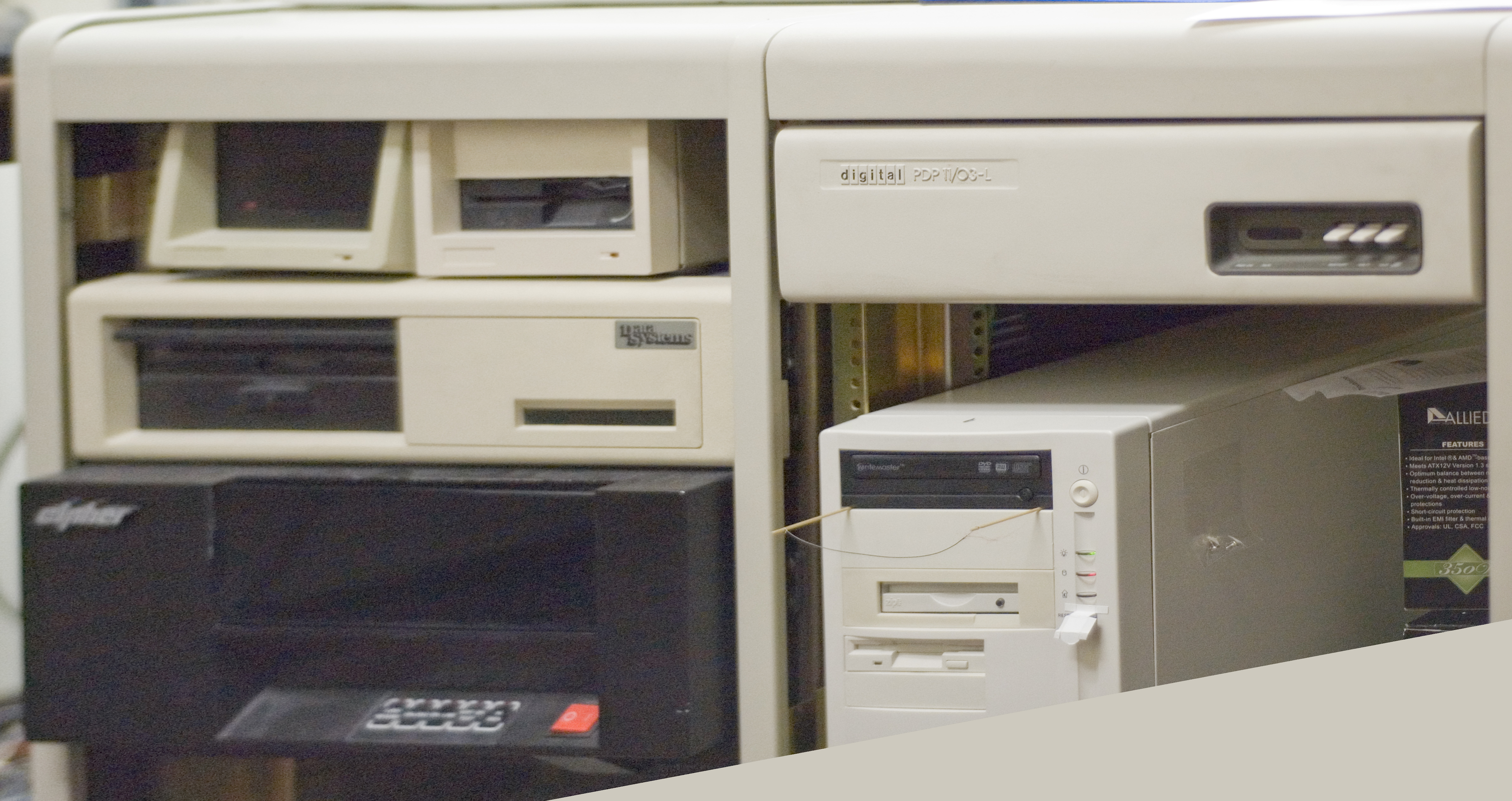
A Cipher 9-track tape drive (bottom right) in a rack with a PDP-11/03 (top right)

In the wake of their newfound independence, Cipher acquired a 38,000-square-foot manufacturing facility in San Diego in 1977. By 1979, at which point the company reported revenues of $14 million in 1979, Cipher maxed out their capacity at this new factory. In 1979, the company purchased another 68,000-square-foot factory in the city and moved their entire base of operations there in April 1980. That year, revenues shot up to over $20 million.

Following Pertec's divestiture of Cipher, Buzz and the two other investors owned 60 percent of Cipher's assets, while Otterson owned the remaining 40 percent. In 1979, Otterson named Don M. Muller, formerly of Pertec, president of Cipher. Otterson retired as CEO of Cipher some time after June 1979, naming Muller as his direct replacement. Muller maintained this post until January 1987 and left Cipher's board of directors in 1988 to helm Optotech, an optical disc manufacturer based in Colorado Springs, Colorado. Edward L. Marinaro, formerly Western Digital's chief financial officer, was named Muller's replacement in 1987.

In the fall of 1981, Cipher filed their initial public offering on the Nasdaq. While revenues stagnated that year, at $23 million, they increased to $151 million by 1984, following the acquisition of Perkin-Elmer's memory products division in 1982 and the successful launch of the CacheTape line of 9-track GCR drives in 1983. CacheTape drives made use of an internal data buffer (at first only 64 KB) to ensure a more continuous stream of data and to reduce the number of so-called "start-stops", which slows down the transfer rate and incurs wear and tear on the tape and the drive (see Tape drive § Technical limitations). The company filed two more public offerings in that span of time and reported a profit of $15 million in fiscal year 1984. That year, Woolley sold off the vast majority of his shares in Cipher and left the board of directors.

=== Decline, acquisition of Irwin Magnetics, and sale to Archive (1985–1992) ===
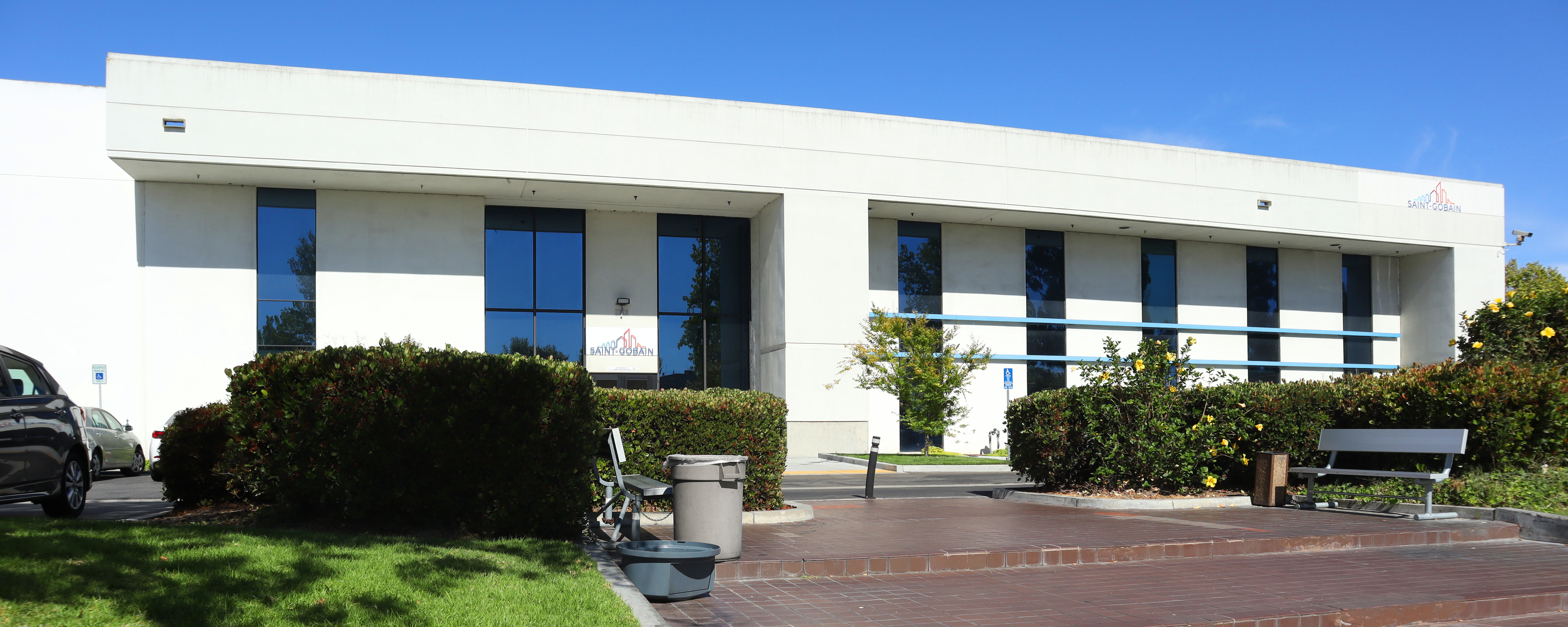
Site of Cipher Data Products' manufacturing plant in Garden Grove, California, now owned by Saint-Gobain, pictured in 2021

By mid-1985, the company had plants in both San Diego, Garden Grove, California, and Mountain View, California. Muller described the company in 1985 as being in a transitional period between focusing on their legacy 9-track reel-to-reel tape products and newer, GCR-based tape cartridges. In 1986, Cipher inked a couple of multi-million dollar deals with IBM to license Cipher's QIC technology for use in the PC RT and the System/36, as well as Cipher's 1880 half-inch, reel-to-reel tape drives for use in the IBM 9370 midrange computer.

Between June and July 1986, Cipher acquired Optimem Inc., a manufacturer of 12-inch, WORM optical discs, from Xerox's Shugart division for $6.3 million. As part of deal, Xerox kept a 10 percent equity position in Optimem and earned royalties on sales of Optimem products. Optimem were deep into development of a rewritable optical disc format, partnering with 3M in pursuit of this goal, when they were acquired by Cipher. Collaborations between 3M and Optimem continued under Cipher's ownership of the latter but had largely stalled by the end of the decade, the company losing a lucrative government contract in the summer of 1987 over Optimem's lackluster performance. In 1988, by which point Cipher had all but given up on the division, Optimem earned contracts with the DoD, NASA, and the USPTO to supply them with WORM disc products.

The payroll at the Garden Grove plant, which manufactured a significant portion of Cipher's tape drives, peaked at 772 workers before Cipher shut it down in October 1986. Cipher had opened up a factory in Singapore earlier in the year to duplicate the plant's manufacturing efforts. Consolidation of Cipher's San Diego plant soon followed, with 220 workers laid off in November 1988, the bulk of whom worked in PCB manufacturing.

In March 1989, Cipher acquired Irwin Magnetic Systems of Ann Arbor, Michigan, for $77 million. Like Cipher, Irwin were makers of the magnetic tape data storage systems—most popularly the AccuTrak line of proprietary tape cartridges, which saw widespread use as a backup product for personal computers. The acquisition was finalized in April that year. Through the acquisition of Irwin, Cipher purchased by proxy their one-time competitor Kennedy Company; Irwin acquired Kennedy earlier in 1988. Irwin continued as a division of Cipher, rechristened as Irwin Products Group and continuing to operate from Ann Arbor. The division assumed the responsibility of all of Cipher's QIC products.

Between December 1989 and March 1990, rival Archive Corporation of Costa Mesa, California, launched a hostile takeover of Cipher Data Products, seeking to acquire the company in whole. Archive had spent the preceding year and a half fighting Cipher in court over patent infringement suits filed by the latter since May 1988. The initial suit regarded Archive's QIC tape drives violating Cipher's patents; Cipher had earlier won a suit against another rival, WangTek, over the same QIC patents. Archive eventually raised the terms of their acquisition sufficiently enough for Cipher to agree to the takeover in March 1990. The acquisition closed in April that year, Cipher's shareholders gaining $120 million in a stock swap.

Following the acquisition, Cipher remained a subsidiary of Archive for roughly two years, with Irwin and Optimem also kept and made separate divisions. Archive's acquisition of the Kennedy Company's patents through Irwin and Cipher proved lucrative for Archive, allowing them to leverage those patents against competitors with the legal threats of their own in the turn of the 1990s. By September 1991, the Cipher division was down to only 50 workers, down from 400 in 1990.

In 1992, Archive transformed Cipher from a vendor of tape drives into a developer of antivirus software. In November 1992, Archive consolidated all their software divisions into one, effectively ending the Cipher company. Archive themselves were acquired by Conner Peripherals, a maker of hard disk drives, in 1993.
