= Archive Corporation =

Data storage company active in the 1980s

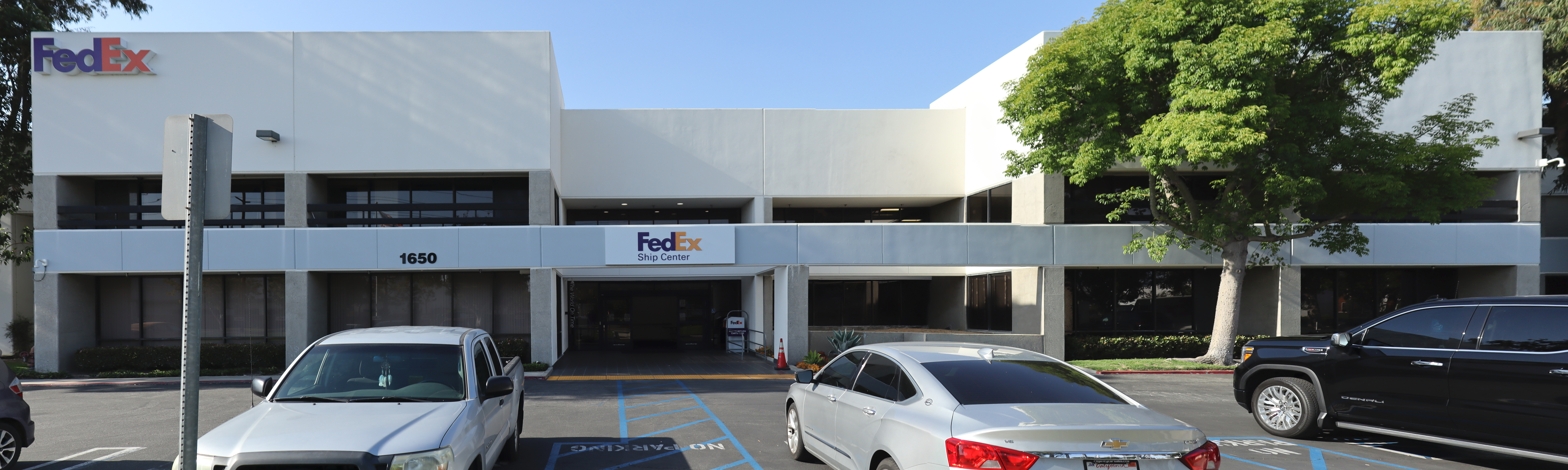
- Former headquarters in Costa Mesa, California, later home to Certance; now a FedEx Ship Center
- Industry: Computer
- Founded: 1980; 46 years ago in Costa Mesa, California
- Defunct: 1993; 33 years ago
- Fate: Acquired by Conner Peripherals
- Products: Tape drives
- Number of employees: 3,367 (1990)

Archive Corporation was a computer tape drive manufacturer, based in Costa Mesa, California, that was acquired by Conner Peripherals in 1992.

== History ==
The company was founded in 1980 and based out of Costa Mesa, California. The company employed 3,367 in 1990 and reached revenues of US$293 million in that year, up from $79 million in 1986.

Of particular note are the Archive DDS tape drives produced for Silicon Graphics that could also read and write Digital Audio Tapes (DAT): the Archive Python 4320 and the Archive Peregrine 4326 (rebranded under Conner or Seagate). In 1990, Archive established Ardat, Inc., as a subsidiary dedicated to marketing the company's DAT drives.

Prior to this, Archive was a leading vendor of the very popular quarter-inch cartridge (QIC) format which was a popular distribution format for Unix workstations and servers. For example, software for the Sun-3 (running the Motorola 68K family) and the Sun-4 (based on SPARC processors) was most commonly distributed on QIC media before CD-ROMs became more cost-effective. Archive was better known for its QIC drives.

Conner Peripherals acquired Archive in December 1992 for about $151 million.

== Acquisitions ==
In 1989, Archive acquired Maynard Electronics. The MaynStream brand of tape drives and software was maintained.

In March 1990, Archive acquired Cipher Data Products for $120 million. This included Cipher's subsidiary Irwin Magnetic Systems.
