= Fifth Generation Systems =

American utility software company, 1984–1993

Fifth Generation Systems, Inc.
- Industry: Utility software, computer security
- Founded: October 1984; 41 years ago in Baton Rouge, Louisiana, United States
- Defunct: October 4, 1993; 32 years ago
- Fate: Acquired by Symantec for US$53.8 million
- Headquarters: Baton Rouge, Louisiana, United States
- Parent: Symantec

Fifth Generation Systems, Inc. was an American utility software and computer security company founded in October 1984 in Baton Rouge, Louisiana, by Robert Mitchell, Leroy Mitchell, Roger Ivey and Bruce Ray. The company developed a broad range of productivity and security tools for both Macintosh and PC platforms, with products spanning backup, file compression, disk management, font management and virus scanning. Symantec acquired Fifth Generation Systems on 4 October 1993 for US$53.8 million.

== History ==
Fifth Generation Systems was founded in 1984 and grew to become a significant publisher of system utilities through the late 1980s and early 1990s. Its flagship product, FastBack, was an early hard disk backup utility that competed directly with The Norton Backup from Symantec.

All four founders later departed following the acquisition of the company by Barry Bellue, who was subsequently accused of fraud and theft from company accounts.

Symantec acquired Fifth Generation Systems in October 1993 for US$53.8 million, absorbing its product lines into the Symantec and Norton portfolio.

== Products ==
- FastBack (PC, Mac) — hard disk backup utility; competed with Norton Backup
- DiskDoubler (Mac) — on-the-fly hard drive compression software
- CopyDoubler (Mac) — system utility for accelerating file copies and managing copy queues
- DiskLock (PC, Mac) — security software incorporating access control and encryption
- Public Utilities (Mac) — disk optimisation, repair and data recovery, developed by Sentient Software
- PowerStation (Mac)
- Pyro! (Mac) — screensaver displaying fireworks and user-selectable animations
- Search&Destroy (PC) — virus scanner for DOS and Windows, included in Novell DOS 7
- Suitcase (Mac) — font management utility
- Super Laser Spool and Super Spool (Mac) — print spoolers, acquired from Supermac Technology in 1990
- Direct Access (PC) — menu system software for DOS
- ABC SnapGraphix
