= FastBack =

Backup program for personal computers

- FastBack Plus 1.0 for MS-DOS, circa 1987
- Original author: Fifth Generation Systems
- Release: 1987; 39 years ago
- Operating system: MS-DOS, Classic Mac OS, Windows
- Available in: English
- Type: Backup software
- License: Proprietary

FastBack is a legacy software application developed in the late 1980s and early 1990s for backing up MS-DOS and Classic Mac OS computers. It was originally written by Fifth Generation Systems, a company located in Baton Rouge, Louisiana. When the company wanted to expand into the Apple market they purchased and rebranded a product from TouchStone Software Corporation. It ceased to be independently maintained circa 1992, although downloadable versions remained on the Internet through at least the mid-2010s for legacy projects.

The original FastBack was unique in the industry in that it was able to read from a computer hard drive and write to the floppy drive simultaneously using the full capability of the dual-channel DMA chip found in IBM PC compatibles of that time. When combined with compression techniques and a proprietary disk format that stored 720KB of data on each 360KB 5¼-inch floppy disk (only in 1.2MB drives), this made FastBack one of the fastest MS-DOS backup programs at the time.

== Version history ==
By 1984, FastBack (Version 5.13) was already on the market.

In 1987, FastBack Plus 1.0 for DOS was released. This version, or subsequent DOS versions, was released with an unconditional guarantee against harm resulting from use of the software in the terms and conditions. The guarantee contrasted itself with industry norms.

In 1991, FastBack Plus 3.02 for DOS was released.

In February 1992 the company released FastBack Plus 1.0 for Windows, written for PCs running Windows 3.0.

FastBack Plus 2.0 was included with Novell DOS 7 in 1994.

FastBack II was at one point bundled with the "Drive 2.4" floppy disk drive marketed by Kennect Technology.

By 1992, FastBack had been purchased by Symantec Corp., who went on to bundle the application as "Norton Fastback" through version 3 of Norton Utilities for the Macintosh. However, by version 4, Norton Fastback was dropped from Norton's software utility package, bringing an end to FastBack.

- Fastback For The Macintosh v1.01/1.02 – 1987, v1.3 – 1988
- Fastback II v2.10 – 1990
- Fastback Plus v2.6 1991, v3.0.1 – 1992

== Features ==
The New York Times wrote about the standard DOS (MSBACKUP) utility, that it "cannot automatically awaken itself at 3 A.M. to make a full backup onto a quarter-inch cassette drive."

== Reception ==
BYTE in 1989 listed Fastback Plus as among the "Distinction" winners of the BYTE Awards, stating that "if you have a hard drive, we recommend this package".
