= BusinessObjects =

Enterprise software company

Business Objects SA
- Industry: Software
- Founded: 1990; 36 years ago
- Fate: Acquired by SAP (2007; 19 years ago)
- Headquarters: San Jose, California and Paris, France
- Key people: John G. Schwarz, CEO; Bernard Liautaud, Chairman and Founder
- Products: Business intelligence tools Data visualization tools Analytics tools Data warehousing tools ETL tools
- Website: www.sap.com

Business Objects (BO, BOBJ, or BObjects) was an enterprise software company, specializing in business intelligence (BI). Business Objects was acquired in 2007 by German company SAP. The company claimed more than 46,000 customers in its final earnings release prior to being acquired by SAP. Its flagship product was BusinessObjects XI (or BOXI), with components that provide performance management, planning, reporting, query and analysis, as well as enterprise information management. Business Objects also offered consulting and education services to help customers deploy its business intelligence projects. Other toolsets enabled universes (the Business Objects name for a semantic layer between the physical data store and the front-end reporting tool) and ready-written reports to be stored centrally and made selectively available to communities of the users.

== History ==
Bernard Liautaud co-founded Business Objects in 1990 together with Denis Payre, and was chief executive until September 2005, when he became chairman and chief executive until January 2008. The concept of Business Objects and its initial implementation came from Jean-Michel Cambot.

In 1990, the first customer, Coface, was signed. The company went public on NASDAQ in September 1994, making it the first European software company listed in the United States. In 2002, the company made Time magazine Europe's Digital Top 25 of 2002 and were BusinessWeek Europe Stars of Europe.

On 7 October 2007, SAP announced that it would acquire Business Objects for $6.8 billion. As of 22 January 2008, the corporation was fully operated by SAP; this was seen as part of a growing consolidation trend in the business software industry, with Oracle acquiring Hyperion in 2007 and IBM acquiring Cognos in 2008.

Business Objects had two headquarters in San Jose, California, and Paris, France, but their biggest office was in Vancouver, British Columbia, Canada. The company's stock was traded on both the Nasdaq and Euronext Paris (BOB) stock exchanges.

=== Legal ===
On April 2, 2007, a lawsuit from Informatica (inherited by Business Objects from the purchase of Acta Technologies in 2002) resulted in an award of $25 million in damages to Informatica for patent infringement. The lawsuit related to embedded data flows with one input and one output. Informatica asserted that the ActaWorks product (later sold by Business Objects as part of Data Integrator), infringed several Informatica patents including US Patent Nos. 6,014,670 and 6,339,775, both titled "Apparatus and Method for Performing Data Transformations in Data Warehousing." Business Objects subsequently released a new version of Data Integrator (11.7.2) which removed the infringing product capability.

=== Timeline ===
- 1990: Business Objects launches Skipper SQL 2.0.x.
- 1994: Launches BusinessObjects v3.0 and goes public on the NASDAQ in September — the first French software company listed in the United States.
- 1996: Enters the OLAP market and launches BusinessObjects v4.0. Bernard Liautaud named one of BusinessWeek's "Hottest Entrepreneurs of the Year."
- 1997: Introduces WebIntelligence thin client, which enables shared information across an extranet.
- 1999: General Electric (GE) begins working with the company. Business Objects goes public in France on the Premier Marché. Acquires Next Action Technologies.
- 2000: Acquires OLAP@Work for approximately $15 million and announces MDX Connect from this acquisition.
- 2001: SAP signs an OEM and reseller agreement to bundle Crystal Reports. Acquires Blue Edge Software.
- 2001: Signs up its single largest global software licensing transaction with Three, formerly known as Hutchison 3G.
- 2002: Acquires Acta Technologies. Bernard Liautaud named to Business Week's "Stars of Europe," and the company is named one of the "100 Fastest Growing Tech Companies" by Business 2.0. Informatica files a lawsuit against Acta, claiming patent rights infringement.
- 2003: Acquires Crystal Decisions for $820 million. Business Objects releases Dashboard Manager, BusinessObjects Enterprise 6, and BusinessObjects Performance Manager.
- 2004: Debuts new combined company with the slogan, "Our Future is Clear, Crystal Clear." Launches Crystal v10 and BusinessObjects v6.5.
- 2005: Launches BusinessObjects XI. Acquires SRC Software, Infommersion, and Medience. Launches BusinessObjects Enterprise XI Release 2.
- 2006: Business Objects acquires Firstlogic, Inc and Nsite Software, Inc.
- 2006: Acquires ALG Software (formerly Armstrong Laing Group). Launches Crystal Xcelsius, which allows users to transform Microsoft Excel spreadsheet data into interactive Flash media files.
- 2007: Continuing its string of acquisitions, Business Objects acquires Cartesis and Inxight.
- 2007: In October, SAP's Chief Executive Henning Kagermann announced a $6.8 billion deal to acquire Business Objects.
- 2008: In January, SAP absorbs all of Business Objects' offices, and renames the entity "Business Objects, an SAP company". Following the acquisition of Business Objects by SAP, the founder and CEO of Business Objects, Bernard Liautaud, announces his resignation.
- 2009: Business Objects becomes a division of SAP instead of a separate company. The portfolio brand "SAP BusinessObjects" was created. Some former Business Objects employees now officially work for SAP.
