= Seagate Software =

American software company

Seagate Software, Inc.
- Founded: September 1995
- Defunct: November 2000
- Successor: Veritas Technologies; Arctera
- Headquarters: United States
- Key people: Kevin Azzouz

Seagate Software, Inc., was an international software company formed when Seagate Technology merged its software assets with Arcada Software. Kevin Azzouz, Arcada CEO was elected by the Seagate board as president.

Seagate Software sold its Network and storage Management group division to Veritas Software in 1999 in a deal worth $1.6 billion, whilst retaining the Information Management Group, which was later rebranded as Crystal Decisions. On March 29, 2000, Seagate announced the sale of all its remaining Veritas Software shares to Veritas Software. The finalisation of the deal was announced on November 22, 2000.

== See also ==
- NTBackup
