= Finis Conner =

Data storage entrepreneur (b. 1943)

Finis F. Conner
- Born: July 28, 1943 (age 83); Gadsden, Alabama, United States
- Education: San Jose State University
- Occupations: Salesman, Entrepreneur
- Employer(s): Memorex; Shugart Associates; Seagate Technology; Conner Peripherals

Finis Conner (born July 28, 1943) is an American entrepreneur and pioneer of the disk drive industry. Conner co-founded Shugart Associates, Seagate Technology, and Conner Peripherals.

== Early life and education ==
Finis F. Conner (pronounced Fy-niss) was born on July 28, 1943, in Gadsden, Alabama. He was the last of five children born to a carpenter and his wife. Conner grew up poor in Alabama, Texas, and Florida. At the age of 19, with $100 in his pocket, he boarded a train for San Jose, California, where a brother lived. Conner found a job as a clerk-typist at IBM and put himself through college, earning a degree in industrial management from San Jose State College in 1969.

== Career ==
=== Shugart Associates ===
Conner met Alan Shugart at Memorex in the early 1970s. In 1973, Shugart, Conner, and seven others founded Shugart Associates, a company that pioneered the development of floppy disks. At Shugart Associates, Conner was initially responsible for OEM Marketing ultimately becoming its Western Region Sales Manager. Shugart Associates was acquired in 1977 by Xerox.

=== Seagate Technology ===
In 1979, Conner, Shugart, and two others founded the hard drive manufacturer Seagate Technology. Seagate pioneered the 5.25-inch hard disk drive (HDD) form factor. The first 5.25-inch HDD was the ST506. Its capacity was 5 MB. By 1984, there were differences with Seagate management, with Conner arguing that there was not enough emphasis on customer requests.

Conner left Seagate, with $12 million in Seagate stock, to enjoy a semi-retirement.

=== Conner Peripherals ===
In 1985, John Squires left MiniScribe and with financing from Terry Johnson (MiniScribe founder) founded CoData to work on a new 3.5-inch disk drive. With a prototype of their product completed, Squires and Johnson approached Conner about joining Codata in late 1985. In 1986, Conner merged his then defunct company, Conner Peripherals, with Squires and Johnson's CoData, adopting the name Conner Peripherals for the merged entity. Conner had trouble finding financing from venture capitalists, so he approached Compaq, which was in the market for an improved HDD for a portable computer it had under development. Compaq provided $12 million of capital. By 1987 (the first year of mass production), Conner had sold $113 million worth of 3.5" HDD, with 90% of the proceeds going to Compaq. The first 3.5-inch product was the CP340 HDD, which had a capacity of 20 MB. The subsequent HDD, CP341, established the popularity of the ATA interface originally proposed by Western Digital.

By 1990, Conner Peripherals was the fastest growing start-up company in the history of US commerce, According to Finis Conner, one key aspect of success was the company's practice of buying all the components (heads, disks, motors, chips) from other manufacturers and focusing on excellence in high-volume assembly and manufacturing. Conner peripherals was merged into Seagate in February 1996, at which point he left the company. For its fiscal year ending December 31, 1995, Conner reported about $2.4 billion in revenue compared to Seagate's fiscal year revenue of $4.5 billion.

=== Career after Conner Peripherals ===
Since the merger with Seagate, Conner has pursued a number of activities:

- He set up Conner Group, which includes several enterprises, some of which focus on Conner's interest in golf.
- Conner Technology PLC was a manufacturer of low-cost 3.5-inch hard disk drives assembled in China, whose goal was to be a high-volume, low-cost supplier of mainstream hard disk drives to leading personal computer suppliers. The company could never deliver the low prices required for personal computer suppliers to switch, and the company shut down its operations in 1998 and merged with ExcelStor in 2001.
- StorCard, founded in 2002, was a company dedicated to developing a new standard in high capacity smart cards. StorCard offered an encrypted, low-cost removable card using semiconductor memory in a credit card size format, along with a compatible receiver mechanism. It closed in 2005.
- In 2010, Conner became CEO of Millenniata in Provo, Utah, which specializes in long-lasting optical archiving technology on the M-Disc. Millenniata was forced into bankruptcy in 2016.
- In 2013, he founded BluStor, a mobile app and smart card that stores fingerprints, voiceprints, facial recognition and iris scans to protect sensitive information.
