= Terry Johnson (entrepreneur) =

American data storage engineer and entrepreneur (1935- 2010)

- Born: March 14, 1935; Ogden, Utah
- Died: July 24, 2010 (aged 75); NW Territories, Canada
- Education: University of Utah, University of California, Berkeley
- Occupations: Engineer, Entrepreneur, Founder of MiniScribe, Co-founder of CoData/Conner), Co-founder of PrairieTek

Terry Johnson (1935–2010) was an American engineer and entrepreneur notable for his work on hard disk drives (HDD) and for pioneering the transition of computers to using smaller disk drives.

After college in 1963, Johnson worked in engineering and management roles at IBM for seven years, followed by two years at Memorex. He then joined Disk Systems Corporation, which was acquired by Storage Technology Corporation (StorageTek or STC). At StorageTek, he helped develop the Super Disk, a hard disk drive (HDD) that had a storage capacity of 800 megabytes (MB), the highest available at the time.

In 1980, Johnson left StorageTek to establish a startup called Miniscribe, a manufacturer of 5.25-inch HDDs. After leaving Miniscribe in 1984, he co-founded a new company, CoData, that merged with Conner Peripherals the following year. CoData's 3.5-inch drive became the company's first product. Additionally, in 1985, Johnson co-founded PrairieTek, the first company to manufacture smaller 2.5-inch drives.

Johnson died in the Northwest Territories, Canada, when his private aircraft crashed during his return from a canoe trip.

== Early years and education ==
Terry Johnson was born in Ogden, Utah, on March 14, 1935, to Clifford Johnson Sr. and Myrtle (née Kunz) Johnson. He grew up in Ogden but spent his summers on a ranch in Clover Valley, Nevada. After graduating from high school in 1953, he started college but left in 1954 to enlist in the US Navy for four years. During his time in the Navy, Johnson worked as an electronics technician and often felt like a second-class citizen. In 1958, following his military service, he was, therefore, highly motivated to finish his college education to avoid feeling that way for the rest of his life. Johnson earned a Bachelor's degree in electrical engineering from the University of Utah in 1961. After graduating, he received job offers from computer companies Control Data and IBM; however, he chose to pursue a Master's degree first. He worked as an engineer at Hercules Power Company, an aerospace company, for one year before being accepted into graduate studies at the University of California, Berkeley (UC Berkeley). Johnson went on to earn his Master's degree from UC Berkeley in 1963.

== Career ==
=== IBM and Memorex ===
Johnson joined IBM in 1963 in San Jose, California, where he worked for seven years. At IBM, he focused on analog circuit design and servo circuitry. His final project at the company involved designing circuitry for the IBM 3330 during its early development stage. Code-named Merlin, the 3330 was a Direct Access Storage Facility with a disk storage capacity of 100 MB, which was considered high capacity at the time.

After leaving IBM in 1970, Johnson joined Memorex in Silicon Valley, CA. While at IBM, Johnson was limited to working only with components that had already been approved by the company and focused on a narrow section of the circuitry related to the servo system. Realizing that he had fallen behind in terms of state-of-the-art technology, Johnson spent a year at Memorex learning about circuitry innovations. Although his primary role at Memorex was to design the circuitry for the servo system, he was also able to work on the entire system, unlike at IBM where his focus was restricted. Additionally, he contributed to a product that competed with the IBM 3330.

After two years at Memorex, Johnson moved on to a startup called Disk Systems Corporation in the San Francisco Bay Area, a company funded by tape storage manufacturer StorageTek. StorageTek aimed to expand its operations into making disk drives for computer systems.

=== StorageTek ===
StorageTek acquired the startup after two years by exchanging Disk Systems stock for StorageTek stock. Johnson continued his work with the company and relocated to the StorageTek facility in Louisville, Colorado, along with his family and some coworkers. While working on the servo electronics system, he helped develop the 8800 Super Disk, a high-end rotary actuator hard disk drive (HDD). It was named the "Super Disk" due to its large storage capacity of 800 MB, far exceeding any other drive available at the time. This project led to several inventions.

During his five years at StorageTek, Johnson worked as the Program Manager for the 8650 drive, a double density equivalent to the IBM 3350, and then advanced to Director of Engineering for the Disk Division. In 1980, Johnson left the company by mutual agreement after being transitioned to a staff position.

=== MiniScribe ===
Soon after leaving StorageTek, Johnson met with STC colleague Roy Applequist at the National Computer Conference (NCC) in May 1980, held in Anaheim, to discuss establishing another start-up. During NCC, Seagate Technology secured a suite where Al Shugart showcased the newly developed ST506 drive by Shugart Technology. Johnson and Applequist met with Shugart during the presentation, who indirectly encouraged Johnson to start his own company to develop a competitive product. In July 1980, Johnson started the disk drive company, MiniScribe, which he initially operated from the basement of his Colorado home, and served as its chief executive officer (CEO) for four years.

MiniScribe had a challenging start. Johnson recruited a team of ten people from StorageTek to work at his new venture. However, on the company's first day, only Bob Hoppe, a mechanical designer and engineer, showed up. Despite this, Johnson felt encouraged to launch the new company with just one employee. He gradually hired five more employees but did not consider his group a successful team until John Squires joined them in January 1981 after leaving StorageTek. Johnson regarded Squires as his first world-class engineer. Although not a Miniscribe employee, Applequist served as part time consultant for the project and was regarded as the mechanical architect of the initial Miniscribe drives.

The company had difficulties in persuading vendors to supply components until Johnson secured funding from two major New York-based venture capitalist firms. Squires met with a representative from Tandy to present a prototype of their first product, the Miniscribe 1. However, the Tandy executive rejected the product due to several shortcomings: the prototype, which featured two printed circuit boards, lacked manganese-zinc heads, an onboard microprocessor, and onboard diagnostics. This sales call marked a turning point for MiniScribe. When Squires returned to Colorado, Johnson gave him free rein to redesign according to Tandy's specifications, leading to the creation of the Miniscribe 2.

The Miniscribe 2 (Model 2012) was purchased by IBM and shipped in 1982 with their XT personal computer (PC). This IBM model offered a higher storage capacity of 10 MB (formatted) compared to the standard PC at the time and was the first IBM PC to utilize the 5.25-inch hard drive. The IBM contract underpinned the initial product offering (IPO), which raised sufficient capital to invest in building manufacturing capacity. However, less than a year later, IBM cut back its orders and Miniscribe was suspended from trading. When trading resumed, the company's value had fallen by half. In 1984, Johnson resigned from Miniscribe, feeling that the board had lost confidence in him. Miniscribe continued to grow after Johnson left until it went bankrupt in 1989 due to a large inventory scandal.

=== CoData (Conner Peripherals) ===
Three months after Johnson resigned from Miniscribe, John Squires also left the company. The pair decided to form a new company called CoData, aiming to produce a 3.5-inch disk drive. Although other companies, including Miniscribe, had developed a 3.5-inch disk drive, it was not yet a practical product.

After Squires completed an initial design, Johnson, who was looking to strengthen CoData's marketing and seeking an investor for the new company, contacted Finis Conner, co-founder of Seagate Technology and Shugart Associates. Conner had retired with $12 million in Seagate stock and owned a shell company called Conner Peripherals. When he was shown the CoData 3.5-inch prototype disk drive, Conner was very impressed. However, Conner demanded more than just being an investor; he wanted control of the company. Johnson agreed to step aside.

CoData and Conner Peripherals merged in 1986, and Squires' design of the CoData 3.5-inch disk drive became their first product, the Conner CP340. Squire's design of the CP340 set a new standard for integrated control over disk drive dynamics by microcode. Securing Compaq Computers as its first major customer, Conner Peripherals became the fastest-growing company in America, generating $1.337 billion in sales within four years. Johnson held 7.1% of the Conner stock at the time it went public in 1988.

=== PrairieTek ===
After leaving CoData, Terry Johnson persuaded Disk Systems cohort Jim Morehouse to join him in founding PrairieTek in 1986 to build a 2.5" drive, a new form factor aimed at the emerging laptop market. Computer companies were pursuing smaller size, lower weight, and longer battery life. Established disk companies recognized the need for something smaller than the 3.5" disk drive and Johnson saw a niche for this new kind of disk drive. Scaling down a 3.5" design was not sufficient for the laptop market where shock-resistance and low power consumption were important. The technical team at PrairieTek designed a drive that became a prototype for successive generations of disk drives. Ramp Load/Unload was a key feature of PrairieTek drives.

But being early to market with a good new design was not enough. According to "The Innovator's Dilemma":

In 1989 an industry entrant in Longmont, Colorado, PrairieTek, upstaged the industry by announcing a 2.5-inch drive, capturing nearly all $30 million of this nascent market. But Conner Peripherals announced its own 2.5-inch product in early 1990 and by the end of that year had claimed 95 percent of the 2.5-inch drive market. Prairietek declared bankruptcy in late 1991, by which time each of the other 3.5-inch drive makers—Quantum, Seagate, Western Digital, and Maxtor—had introduced 2.5-inch drives of their own.

Demand for 2.5" drives rose but PrairieTek filed for bankruptcy in 1991. Johnson did not blame his competitors for the company's demise, but saw it as a failure to execute on his part.

== Personal life ==
Johnson was married and had three children.

Although he remained interested in the data storage industry, Johnson did not start any more new ventures or work in the disk drive manufacturer industry after his time with PrairieTek. An avid fisherman, Johnson died on July 24, 2010, when piloting his plane back from a trip to Canada. At the time of his death, he was a resident of Longmont, Colorado.
