= Laurence Spitters =

American industrialist and investor

- Spitters dedicates the company headquarters building in Santa Clara, California, 1971
- Born: United States
- Other name: Larry Spitters
- Education: Harvard Business School
- Occupations: Industrialist; investor
- Years active: 1954–1974
- Known for: co-founder of Memorex

Laurence "Larry" Spitters is an American industrialist and investor who co-founded the Memorex corporation.

== Early life ==
Spitters was born in the United States and obtained a B.A. from Western Michigan University in 1949, a J.D. from University of Michigan Law School and an MBA from Harvard Business School

== Career ==
Spitters began his career as an investment banker with Blyth & Co. in 1954 and worked on Wall Street before transferring to Blyth's office in San Francisco, California. During his tenure at Blyth he was a member of the underwriting and investment banking department and was engaged in the origination, underwriting, and syndication of issues of corporate securities for public distribution, private placement of securities with institutional investors, and evaluation of companies involved in merger and acquisition transactions.

In 1958, he joined Ampex Corporation in Redwood City, California, a firm whose financing he had assisted while previously employed at Blyth & Co. As Assistant to the Vice President and Treasurer at Ampex, he spearheaded Ampex's initial public offering (IPO) in 1959. In addition, he led Ampex's study to merge with Orr Industries, a magnetic tape manufacturing affiliate. In 1960, he was made Ampex's Assistant Treasurer where he worked closely with the firm's founder Alexander M. Poniatoff, particularly in the company's merger with Telemater Magnetics, Inc., a Los Angeles-based manufacturer of magnetic cores, buffers, and memories for data processing and computer systems.

=== Memorex ===
In 1961, Laurence (Larry) Spitters founded Memorex Corporation in Santa Clara, California, along with three engineers from Ampex (Arnold T. Challman, Donald F. Eldridge, W. Lawrence Noon) in order to enter the precision magnetic tape market. Memorex was the first company to manufacture chromium dioxide cassettes in substantial volume. In addition, Memorex entered the computer systems business by first establishing its presence as a supplier of products that were plug compatible with IBM mainframe systems and then using its established sales and service capabilities to offer complete computer systems.

Memorex's disk drive division, led by Alan Shugart, produced the Memorex 650 in 1972, the first read-write floppy disk drive. The Memorex 650 had a capacity of 175kB, with 50 tracks, 8 sectors per track, and 448 bytes per sector. While Memorex successfully competed in the IBM plug-compatible disk storage and communications products market, a series of extremely aggressive pricing and product actions by IBM attacked Memorex's equipment businesses and resulted in lengthy antitrust litigation against IBM.

A consumer products division established in 1970 made Memorex a household name with the Is it live or is it Memorex? advertising campaign from the Leo Burnett agency which featured jazz singer Ella Fitzgerald and a shattering wineglass (now in the collection of the Smithsonian Institution). During the 1970s, Memorex produced cassette tapes which were marketed vigorously through heavy television advertising.

Spitters resigned as Memorex's President, Chief Executive Officer, and Director of the Company effective April 26, 1974, the date of the Annual Meeting.

== Recognition ==
Spitters received an honorary degree from Santa Clara University and a Distinguished Alumni Award from Western Michigan University. He served on the Santa Clara University Board of Trustees, and the Board of Directors of ALZA Corp., The Children's Health Council, and The Embarcadero Publishing Company, publisher of the Palo Alto Weekly.

Spitters had been a financial contributor to American Conservatory Theater.
