= Seagate Seven =

The Seagate Seven is an external hard disk drive product announced by Seagate Technology during the 2015 Consumer Electronics Show. It has a capacity of 500 GB with a thickness of 7mm.

== Reception ==
Reviewers from PC Magazine, CNET and TechRadar noted the Seagate Seven's slim design, but also its relatively high price for its capacity.
