= Rita Shugart =

American bridge player

Rita Shugart (née Kennedy) is an American bridge player.

Shugart won her first North American Bridge Championship in 1998. She won the Reisinger, arguably the most difficult of all the North American Bridge Championships to win, in consecutive years, 1998, 1999, playing four handed. Shugart is the only female to win the event in over 60 years.

Rita Shugart was the second wife of American engineer and business executive Alan Shugart.

== Bridge accomplishments ==
=== Wins ===
- North American Bridge Championships (3)
  - Mitchell Board-a-Match Teams (1) 1999
  - Reisinger (2) 1998, 1999

=== Runners-up ===
- North American Bridge Championships
  - Chicago Mixed Board-a-Match (1) 1998
