= Alan Shugart =

American entrepreneur and engineer (1930–2006)

- Born: September 27, 1930; Los Angeles, California, US
- Died: December 12, 2006 (aged 76); Monterey, California, US
- Education: University of Redlands (B.S., 1951)
- Occupations: Engineer and entrepreneur
- Known for: Disk storage pioneer; Shugart Associates founder; Seagate Technology founder
- Title: CEO of Seagate Technology
- Successor: Stephen J. Luczo
- Spouse(s): Esther Marrs (m. 1951–1973) Rita Shugart (m. 1981)
- Children: 3

Alan Field Shugart (September 27, 1930 – December 12, 2006) was an American engineer, entrepreneur and business executive whose career defined the modern computer disk drive industry.

== Personal history ==
Born in Los Angeles, he graduated from the University of Redlands, receiving a degree in engineering physics.

Shugart was the father of three children: Joanne Shugart (1951–1954), Christopher D. Shugart (b. 1953) and Teri L.K. Shugart (b. 1955). Shugart was married to Esther Marrs (née Bell), the mother of his three children, from 1951 until 1973. He was married to Rita Shugart (née Kennedy) from 1981 until his death.

Shugart died at age 76 on December 12, 2006, in Monterey, California, of complications from heart surgery he had undergone six weeks earlier.

== Career ==
He began his career in 1951 as a field engineer at IBM. In 1955, he transferred to the IBM San Jose laboratory where he worked on the IBM 305 RAMAC. He rose through a series of increasingly important positions to become the Direct Access Storage Product Manager, responsible for disk storage products, IBM's most profitable businesses at that time. Among the groups reporting to Shugart was the team that invented the floppy disk.

Shugart joined Memorex in 1969 as Vice President of its Equipment Division and led the development of its 3660 (compatible with IBM 2314) and 3670 (compatible with IBM 3330) disk storage subsystems. His team also developed the Memorex 650, one of the first commercially available floppy disk drives.

He founded Shugart Associates in February 1973 and resigned as CEO in October 1974. The company was later acquired by Xerox. Then he and Finis Conner started Shugart Technology in 1979, which soon changed its name to Seagate Technology.

In 1991, Shugart resumed his tenure as CEO of Seagate. Seagate went on to become the world’s largest independent manufacturer of disk drives and related components. In July 1998, Shugart resigned his positions with Seagate.

== Political activity ==
In 1996, he launched an unsuccessful campaign to elect Ernest, his Bernese Mountain Dog, to Congress. Shugart later wrote about that experience in a book, Ernest Goes to Washington (Well, Not Exactly). He backed a failed ballot initiative in 2000 to give California voters the option of choosing "none of the above" in elections.

== Awards ==
He received the 1997 IEEE Reynold B. Johnson Information Storage Systems Award. In 2005, he was made a Fellow of the Computer History Museum "for his lifelong contributions to the creation of the modern disk drive industry."
