= Dot Hill Systems =

Dot Hill Systems Corp. was a manufacturer of computer storage area network arrays. Providing computer hardware and software products for small and large computer data storage systems. Dot Hill came into being when Box Hill Systems Corp (based in New York) acquired Artecon, Inc. based in Carlsbad, California. BoxHill was already traded on the NYSE as BHSC. After the combined company changed its name to Dot Hill Systems Corp, the symbol changed to HILL. Box Hill sold hardware products with names including the word Box as well as backup software and renamed OEM tape libraries from manufacturers like ATL Odetics and StorageTek. Artecon sold its own selection of drive array products with the additional selling point of being NEBS-certified. Around 1998 or 1999, Box Hill had found itself in a difficult position. Its flagship fibre channel product was unable to deliver the features originally intended and had to rely on software RAID instead. It performed well mirroring, but fell short otherwise. After the acquisition by Dot Hill, the inevitable merging of products and talent led to the eventual migration of the headquarters to Carlsbad and a shift away from backup and tape products. The resulting changes lead to a large change in workforce as the former Artecon management team took the lead.

In 2004 Dot Hill acquired Chaparral Network Storage in Longmont, Colorado. Chaparral Network Storage was started in 2000 and also manufactured storage systems. In 2010 Dot Hill start moving almost all Carlsbad operations to Longmont. Dot Hill continued to be listed on the NASDAQ as HILL.

Dot Hill products have interfaces supporting Fibre Channel (FC), Ethernet-based Internet Small Computer Systems Interface (iSCSI), and Serial Attached SCSI (SAS). Products include hard drives and solid-state drives (SSDs). Dot Hill's storage arrays support RAID data protection of various types (RAID 1/10/5/50/6/60). Data center storage management applications run on Windows, Linux (RHEL)-(SUSE), Apple's Mac OS X Snow Leopard, Oracle's Solaris, XenServer and VMware ESX servers. With host interfaces to: SSD, SAS and SATA drive technologies.

Seagate Technology finalized the acquisition of the company in October 2015.
