= Maxtor =

1982–2006 American hard disk drive manufacturer

Maxtor Corporation
- Type: Public
- Traded as: NYSE: MXO
- Industry: Technology
- Founded: 1982; 44 years ago
- Founder: James McCoy, Jack Swartz, and Raymond Niedzwiecki
- Defunct: June 30, 2006; 20 years ago (company)
- Fate: Acquired by Seagate Technology
- Headquarters: 500 McCarthy Boulevard, Milpitas, California, United States
- Area served: Worldwide
- Key people: James McCoy, Jack Swartz, and Raymond Niedzwiecki (founders)
- Products: Hard disk drives
- Owner: Seagate Technology

Maxtor Corporation was an American computer hard disk drive manufacturer. Founded in 1982, it was the third largest hard disk drive manufacturer in the world before being purchased by Seagate in 2006. It was revived as a brand in 2016.

Maxtor is a portmanteau of maximum and storage.

== History ==
=== Overview ===
In 1981, three former IBM employees began searching for funding, and Maxtor was founded the following year. In 1983, Maxtor shipped its first product, the Maxtor XT-1140. In 1985, Maxtor filed its initial public offering and started trading on the New York Stock Exchange as "MXO". Maxtor bought hard drive manufacturer MiniScribe in 1990. Maxtor was getting close to bankruptcy in 1992 and closed its engineering operations in San Jose, California, in 1993. In 1993, Hyundai Electronics bought a 40% stake in Maxtor. In 1996, Maxtor introduced its DiamondMax line of hard drives with DSP-based architecture. Hyundai acquired Maxtor in 1996 and took in public in 1998. In 2000, Maxtor acquired Quantum's hard drive division, which gave Maxtor the ATA/133 hard drive interface and helped Maxtor revive its server hard drive market. In 2006, Maxtor was acquired by Seagate.

=== Early financing ===
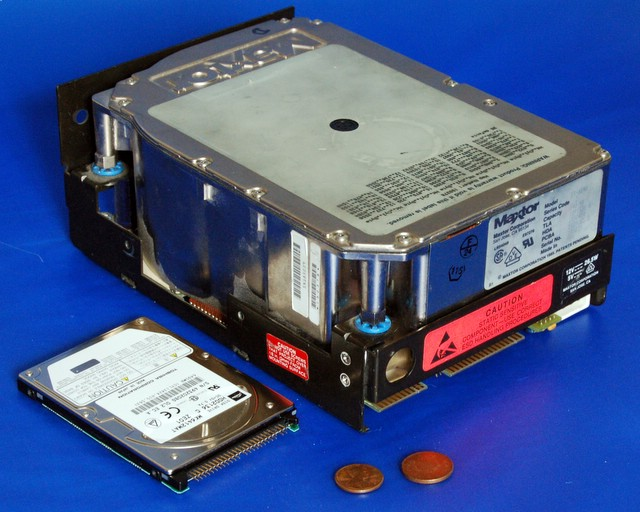
An early Maxtor hard drive (right) with a more modern laptop hard drive and coins (front) for size comparison

The Maxtor founders, James McCoy, Jack Swartz, and Raymond Niedzwiecki—graduates of the San Jose State University School of Engineering and former employees of IBM—began the search for funding in 1981. In early 1982, B.J. Cassin and Chuck Hazel (Bay Partners) provided the initial $3 million funding and the company officially began operations on July 1, 1982. In February 1983, it shipped its first product to Convergent Technology and immediately received an additional $5.5 million in its second round of funding. The company also began negotiations with the EDB (Economic Development Board) of Singapore for favorable terms before committing to Singapore as its offshore manufacturing location. The DBS (Development Bank of Singapore) agreed to provide financing to help grow the company in Singapore. In 1983, the company established a liaison and procurement office in Tokyo, headed by Tatsuya Yamamoto.

Maxtor's product architecture used eight disks; 15 surfaces recorded data and the final surface was where the servo track information was located. The company developed its own spindle motor, which was fitted within the casting containing the disks. This was a major departure as the spindle motor was usually mounted external to the disks. The first product was designed to provide 190 MB of storage, but delays in getting magnetic heads to the Maxtor design resulted in the company taking what was available, and the first drive—the XT-1140—was shipped with a capacity of only 140 MB. The company received an additional round of financing of approximately $37 million in 1984 before going public in 1986, with Goldman Sachs as the prime underwriter.

=== Expansion ===
In December 1986, Maxtor acquired U.S. Design Corporation, a loss-making manufacturer of data storage subsystems for microcomputers, for $16.1 million in a stock swap. The acquisition was finalized in January 1987. In June 1987, Maxtor purchased Storage Dimensions, a maker of high-performance, high-capacity HDD subsystems for the IBM PC (which chiefly made use of Maxtor's own drives), for an undisclosed sum. The acquisition was a success story for Maxtor, and the subsidiary had grown to generate $80 million in sales by 1992. That year, Maxtor sold off Storage Dimensions to private investors.

In 1990, Maxtor entered the mass market with its purchase of the assets (but not the liabilities) of bankrupt MiniScribe in Longmont, Colorado. The transition was a tough one as the early products of this union (notably the 7120AT 3.5-inch 120 MB drive) had many quality and design problems. Later products managed to sell well despite the initial problems. In 1996, the company completely redesigned its hard drive product line by introducing its DiamondMax series with a Texas Instruments digital signal processor.

=== Financial troubles ===
After nine years of development, the original XT-series of drives had achieved a capacity of 1 GB. Maxtor sold the rights to the series to Sequel of Santa Clara, California in the mid-1990s, and the company exited the server drive market. Sequel, a spin-off of Unisys, was not a disk drive manufacturer; rather, they specialized in refurbishing drives for the existing customer base. Teetering on the brink of bankruptcy in 1992, Maxtor's exit from the high-capacity 5.25-inch SCSI market temporarily left a product void in the industry. Around this time, SCSI versions of the 7000 series drives were also discontinued, and all engineering operations in San Jose were shut down in late 1993, leaving only the former MiniScribe design engineering staff. After turnover in the executive staff, Maxtor decided it had made a mistake, and when Maxtor moved its headquarters to Milpitas, California, it gradually began to rebuild its engineering staff.

=== Acquisition of the Quantum hard drive division ===
In late 2000, Maxtor acquired the hard drive business of Quantum. The merger, which was completed on April 1, 2001, made Maxtor larger than its rivals, notably Seagate, and returned it to the server hard drive market and also implemented the ATA/133 interface into its hard drives.

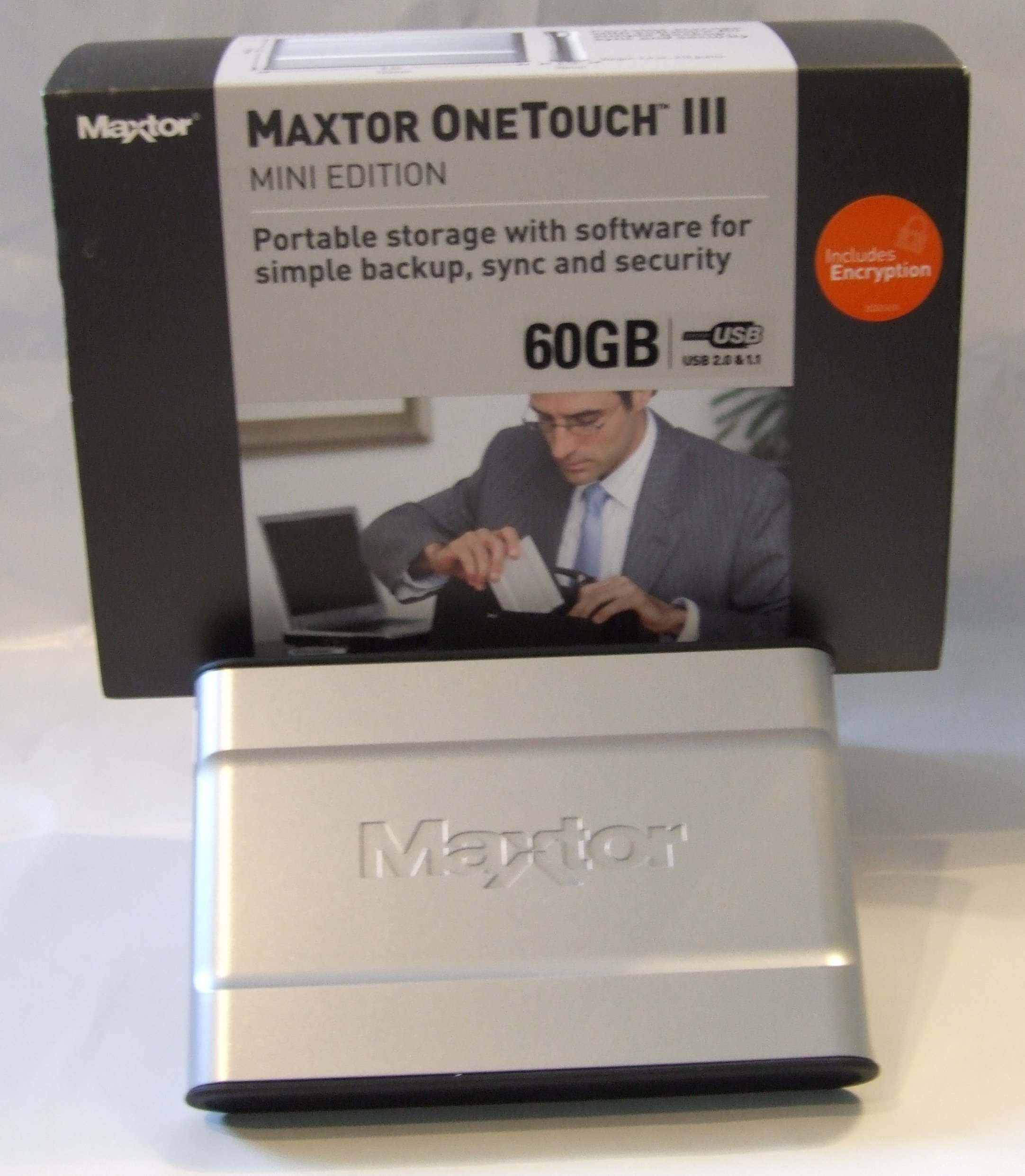
Maxtor OneTouch III Mini Edition

=== Focus on external drives ===
Leveraging the advent of USB 2.0—which finally provided sufficient bandwidth to make large-scale external backups practical—Maxtor dominated the consumer market with its OneTouch line. The OneTouch II (500 GB–1 TB) featured a dedicated button for instant drive mirroring, selling millions of units globally.

In early 2005, management controversially discontinued 2.5-inch drive development. Industry analysts criticized this exit, as the market for notebooks and MP3 players was rapidly expanding.

=== Acquisition by Seagate ===
In a deal worth nearly US$2 billion, Maxtor was acquired by its rival Seagate in 2006. The Maxtor brand was revived by Seagate in later 2016.

== Competitors ==
- Adaptec
- Fabrik Inc.
- Hitachi Global Storage Technologies
- Iomega
- Samsung
- Western Digital
