= Stephen J. Luczo =

American film producer (born 1957)

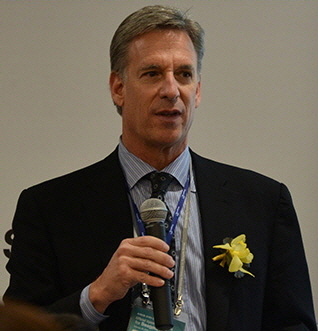
- Born: February 28, 1957 (age 69); Chicago, Illinois, U.S.
- Employer: Seagate
- Title: Chairman of the Board of Directors
- Predecessor: Alan Shugart
- Successor: incumbent
- Board member of: Seagate Technology; AT&T; Morgan Stanley; Lucile Packard Children's Hospital Stanford

Stephen J. Luczo (born February 28, 1957) is the chairman of the board at Seagate. In January 2009, Luczo, Seagate's chairman, was appointed president and chief executive officer, returning him to the role he held at Seagate from 1998 to 2004. He held the position of CEO again from 2009 until October 1, 2017.

Luczo is a member of the National Advisory Council for the World Wildlife Fund, a member of the advisory board for All-Stars Helping Kids, a senior advisor to non-profit educational organization the Silicon Valley Japan Platform and is active in a variety of charitable and for-profit ventures through a wholly owned entity, Balance Vector, Inc. His charity initiatives are primarily focused on global environmental issues and programs to help at-risk children in the urban centers of the United States and the rural areas of Sicily, and he is a major donor to Stanford University and Hospital, the World Wildlife Fund, and the Palo Alto Medical Foundation. In 2015, to recognize his support for education in service to the Italian Republic, Italy's President Sergio Mattarella honored Luczo with the title Cavaliere dell’Ordine della Stella d’Italia (a knighthood known in English as the "Order of the Star of Italian Solidarity"). In 2017 he received the honorary degree DSc (Econ) for services to business and commerce from Queen's University of Belfast in recognition of the role that Seagate Technology has had in Northern Ireland since 1993. In 2019, Pope Francis conferred upon Steve and Agatha Luczo the Pontifical Order of Pope Saint Sylvester (one of five Orders of Knighthood awarded directly by the Pope), in recognition of their philanthropy.

Luczo is on the boards of directors of AT&T, Morgan Stanley, and Lucille Packard Children's Hospital Stanford. He has been on the boards of directors of Microsoft Corporation (including the CEO Search Committee and chairman of the Compensation Committee), Veritas Software, VMWare, and the World Wildlife Fund. Luczo also was on the advisory boards of the New York Stock Exchange (NYSE) and the Stanford Graduate School of Business.

== Early life ==
Stephen Luczo was born on February 28, 1957, in Chicago, Illinois at Augustana Hospital. He is the youngest of three sons of Thomas and Rose Luczo. The family moved to Park Ridge in 1959, where Luczo lived until 1976 when he moved to California to attend Stanford University. Luczo attended public schools through high school and attended the University of Illinois at Urbana–Champaign in 1975–76, before transferring to Stanford in September 1976. He holds a BA, economics and psychology, and MBA from Stanford University.

In 1979, Luczo earned a BA in Economics, with honors, and also completed a major in Psychology, from Stanford University. Luczo received the Laura Myer Award for the outstanding undergraduate honors thesis in the Economics Department. His work centered on break through analysis concerning the decline in the African American fertility rate between 1890 and 1940. Luczo's work focused on detailed statistical analysis of census data attributes, which correlated the decline in family size as direct decisions of African Americans to address economic conditions and opportunities. While such considerations, and conclusions, had been attributed to the white decline in fertility over the same time period, prior to Luczo's work, most historians attributed the decline in African American fertility to issues related to health and disease. In addition to his work in economics, Luczo completed all requirements for a psychology major, while at Stanford. He specialized in Neuropsychology, and took several graduate level courses including extensive work with Karl Pribram. Luczo wrote several research papers on memory systems in the human brain, specifically addressing and supporting Pribram's thesis of holographic constructs in the human brain.

Luczo returned to Stanford in 1982, where he attended the Graduate School of Business (GSB). He graduated in 1984 and concentrated his course work in finance. While at the GSB, Luczo was a co-founder (along with Robert Moog, Dave Bagshaw, and Scott Setrakian) of the Hercules Horseshoe Club ("HHC") and of the Hard Core Awards. Both activities were centered on fostering cooperation and conversation between teachers, administrators and students. Luczo still holds the record for most consecutive match wins at the HHC.

== Early career ==
After graduating from Stanford in 1979, Luzco was hired as a staff accountant in the audit practice of Touche Ross & Co., one of the original "Big Eight" accounting firms. Luczo was the first non-accounting major hired by the firm to work in the audit group. During his first year, he was assigned to assist the City and County of San Francisco in transitioning to a new, then state of the art, mini computing system. During the transition, the city lost control over its cash and payables system, and Luczo was assigned to a three-member special team appointed by Mayor Dianne Feinstein, to resolve the system issue, which had resulted in a $200 million discrepancy between the cash system and the payable system. The issue was resolved within five days and as a result, Luczo was offered the opportunity to lead system deployment at any of five major City Departments.

Luczo left Touche Ross in 1980 to pursue the system development and deployment at the Port of San Francisco, which was transitioning from a Sperry Univac 1005 to a Microdata Minicomputer. He was responsible for managing all systems and application architecture and development for the Port, reporting to the chief financial officer. In late 1981 he was promoted to acting CFO of the Port, and resigned in August 1982 to attend the Stanford Graduate School of Business.

After graduating from the Stanford GSB in 1984, Luzco joined Salomon Brothers, Inc, and was hired into the Municipal Finance Department, and was based in San Francisco. Salomon was the leading underwriter of Municipal Bonds nationally as was the Firms West Coast office, under the leadership of Terry Atkinson. Luczo financed a wide variety of municipal projects including those for the Irvine Ranch Water District, the LA Department of Water and Power ("LADWOP"), the Metropolitan Water District of LA, the Orange County ("John Wayne") Airport, the University of Arizona, the Central Arizona Water Project, the Sisters of Providence Health Care System, and the Santa Clara Water District. Luczo was involved with over 50 financings, which provided billions of dollars of funding for important infrastructure, educational and health care projects.

Luczo was the senior managing director of the Global Technology Group of Bear, Stearns & Co. Inc., an investment banking firm, from February 1992 to October 1993. Prior to joining Bear, Stearns & Co., he was an investment banker at Salomon Brothers, Inc. from 1984 to 1992. While at Salomon Brothers, Luczo led the investment banking team for Seagate when it acquired the Imprimis Disk Drive Unit from Control Data in 1989. Subsequent to his advisory work for Seagate, Luczo advised Control Data in the formation of Ceridian and Control Data Systems.

== Seagate ==
Luczo joined Seagate Technology in October 1993 as senior vice president of corporate development. In March 1995, he was appointed executive vice president of corporate development and chief operating officer of Seagate Software Holdings. In 1996, Luczo led the Seagate acquisition of Conner Peripherals, creating the world's largest disk drive manufacturer and completed the company's strategy of vertical integration and ownership of key disk drive components. In September 1997, he was promoted to the position of president and chief operating officer of Seagate Technology, Inc. In 1997, Seagate experienced a downturn, along with the rest of the industry, and launched a restructuring effort. In July 1998, co-founder & CEO Alan Shugart was asked to resign and Luczo became the new chief executive officer, joining the board of directors.

Historically, Seagate's design centers had been organized around function, with one product line manager in charge of tracking the progress of all programs. In 1998, Luczo and CTO Tom Porter characterized the organizational redesign of design centers into core teams organized around individual projects, to meet the corporate objective of faster time to market. As the CEO, Luczo decided to increase investment in technology, and to diversify into faster-growing, higher-margin businesses. He decided to implement a highly automated platform strategy for manufacturing. Between 1997 and 2004, Seagate reduced its headcount from approximately 111,000 to approximately 50,000, rationalized its factory footprint from 24 factories to 11 factories and reduced design centers form seven to three. During this period, Seagate output increased from approximately 9 million drives per quarter to approximately 20 million drives per quarter.

In May 1999, Seagate sold its Network & Storage Management Group (NSMG) to Veritas Software in return for 155 million shares of Veritas' stock. With this deal, Seagate became the largest shareholder in Veritas, with an ownership stake of more than 40%. However, the Seagate board of directors felt that the market was incredibly under pricing Seagate's stock, as was clear from a 200% increase in Veritas stock versus only a 25% increase in Seagate's stock.

Luczo led the management buyout of Seagate in 2000. He believed that Seagate needed to make significant capital investments to achieve its goals. He decided to turn the company private, since disk drive producers had a hard time obtaining capital for long-term projects. In early November 1999, Luzco met with representatives of Silver Lake Partners to discuss a major restructuring of Seagate. After two failed attempts to increase Seagate's stock price and unlock its value from Veritas, Seagate's board of directors authorized Luzco to seek advice from Morgan Stanley in October 1999. In early November 1999, Morgan Stanley arranged a meeting between Seagate executives and representatives of Silver Lake Partners. On November 22, 2000, Seagate management, Veritas Software, and an investor group led by Silver Lake closed a complex deal taking Seagate private in what was at the time the largest buyout ever of a technology company. Both the Stanford Graduate School of Business and the Harvard Business School have written multiple case studies on the Seagate buyout and turnaround. In addition, several leading management books have cited the Seagate turnaround in the contents.

Luczo became the chairman of the board of directors of Seagate Technology on June 19, 2002. In 2003, he accepted an invitation from the New York Stock Exchange to join its Listed Companies Advisory Committee. When the company separated the roles of chairman and CEO in 2004, Luczo resigned as the Seagate CEO on July 3, 2004, but retained his position as chairman of the board of directors.

=== Return ===
In January 2009, Luczo was asked by the Seagate Board to return as CEO of the company, replacing Bill Watkins. As of the date of his hiring, Seagate was losing market share, facing rapidly declining revenues, was lagging in product delivery with high manufacturing costs, had an excessive operating expense structure, and had a balance sheet that was burdened with $2 billion of debt that was due within 2 years. The company's market value was less than $1.5 billion.

Luczo revamped the entire management team, and quickly reorganized the company back to a functional structure after a failed attempt to organize by business units in 2007. Led by a new head of sales, Dave Mosley, a new head of operations and Development, Bob Whitmore, and a new CFO, Pat O'Malley, the team worked to address the multitude of challenges that it faced. By the end of 2009, the company had refinanced its debt, and had begun to turn around its operations. In 2010, Seagate reinstated its dividend and began a stock buyback plan. In 2011, Seagate acquired Samsung's disc drive business and entered into a multi threaded strategic relationship that included Samsung owning about 10% of Seagate. In 2012 Seagate continued to raise its dividend and repurchased nearly 30% of the company's outstanding shares.

In the fiscal year ended June 2012, Seagate had achieved record revenues, record gross margins, record profits and regained its position as the largest disc drive manufacturer, and its market value had increased to over $14 billion.

== Balance Vector ==
In 2004, Luczo founded Balance Vector, Inc. Balance Vector is a privately held company involved in technology and environmental investments (Trade Wins, Inc.), real estate development (Hobo Joe Land and Cattle Company), music (Talking House Productions) and film production (Balance Vector Productions) and sports ownership, with the majority of profits directed to numerous charitable causes.

Through Balance Vector Productions and Verso Entertainment, Luczo and NBA star Baron Davis produced the film Crips and Bloods: Made in America, which was directed by Stacy Peralta and premiered at the 2007 Sundance Film Festival. Luczo's Balance Vector Productions also produced the syndicated TV show, Coolfuel Roadtrip.

Balance Vector Sports includes ownership interest in the Boston Celtics, the Vancouver Whitecaps FC (with Greg Kerfoot, Steve Nash and Jeff Mallet) and IndyCar Series team Luczo Dragon Racing. In addition, Balance Vector Sports has been the primary sponsor to the world champion adventure racing team from New Zealand, three-time kite surfing world champion Cindy Mosey, two-time world free skiing champion Kit DesLauriers, and big wave champion surfer Garrett McNamara.

== Personal life ==
Steve Luczo is married to Agatha Relota Luczo, a fashion model who has appeared in magazines including Vogue, W Magazine, Elle and Harpers Bazaar, for brand campaigns including those of Chanel, Yves Saint Laurent, Hermes, and Nina Ricci, and who has worked with fashion photographers Patrick Demarchelier, Steven Klein, Juergen Teller, David LaChapelle, and Scavullo, among others. Agatha is the author of a children's book called Carla and Leo's World of Dance. Steve and Agatha Luczo have four children: Rosalia Antonia, George Thomas, Cosimo Josip and Anica Katherine. Steve has a tattoo of Agatha's native name (Agata) on his ring finger.

Since 2008, Luczo has been active in charitable and economic work in rural Sicily through the Zimbardo-Luczo Fund which provides scholarships for academically gifted students from Corleone and Cammarata. In addition to 125 scholarships awarded over the last 5 years, the fund has provided support for computer labs in primary and middle schools and a music lab in a Corleone high school, facilities to support disabled citizens of Cammarata, and cultural arts festivals in Corleone and Cammarata.

Luczo's company Balance Vector has sponsored many world championships and professional-level events such as the $75,000 purse for Maverick's Surf Contest in 2004. He has also made numerous financial contribution to charities focused on at-risk children or environmental issues such as SurfAid International. On March 19, 2007, Luczo made a $100,000 donation to the Wikimedia Foundation. He is one of the co-founders of Talking House Productions, a production company specializing in music and other audio arts programming.

In May 2007 Luczo ran an entry in the Indianapolis 500 paired with Jay Penske co-owners of Luczo-Dragon Racing Ltd., their driver was Ryan Briscoe, sponsored by Symantec. Briscoe qualified 7th and finished in 5th position. The team ran six races in 2008 and will compete in the IndyCar Series full-time in 2009 with champion driver Raphael Matos.

Luczo endorsed Democratic candidate Hillary Clinton in the 2016 U.S. presidential election.

== Honors ==
In 2016 Institutional Investor ranked Luczo among the world's top 3 CEOs of IT Hardware & Electronics Manufacturing Services companies, based on the votes of sell-side analysts; in 2015 the magazine ranked him a top 3 CEO in the same category, based on buy-side analysts' votes, and in 2014 he was ranked a top 5 CEO by sell-side analysts in the same category. Harvard Business Review has named Luczo among "The Best-Performing CEOs in the World" for several years running, including in 2017 ranking him at number 28, in 2016 at number 66, in 2015 at number 6, and in 2014 at number 34. In 2014, CNN Money named Luczo among the 5 top performing CEOs in America, In 2013 Bloomberg ranked Luczo No. 1 among its Top 20 list of technology leaders. In August 2013, Luczo was awarded the Darjah Setia Pangkuan Negeri (DSPN), the Order of the Defender of State – Knight Commander Malaysia, which carries the title of Dato, for his contributions to the state of Penang. In 2012, Luczo was ranked 21st on Fortune Magazine's Top 50 Businesspersons of the Year.
