= MiniScribe =

Defunct American data storage company

MiniScribe Corporation
- Type: Private
- Industry: Data storage
- Founded: 1980; 46 years ago in Longmont, Colorado
- Founder: Terry Johnson
- Defunct: 1990; 36 years ago
- Fate: Acquired by Maxtor
- Successor: Maxtor Colorado Corporation
- Products: Hard disk drives

MiniScribe Corporation was a manufacturer of disk storage products, founded in Longmont, Colorado in 1980. MiniScribe designed and sold stepper motor-based hard disk drives with a large amount of onboard logic for the time. They eventually moved into higher-profile voice coil motor designs, and won major contracts with IBM. Massive financial fraud starting in 1987 led to bankruptcy in 1990, when its assets were bought by Maxtor and renamed Maxtor Colorado Corporation.

== Foundation, early slump, and recapitalization ==
Logo used from 1983 to 1986

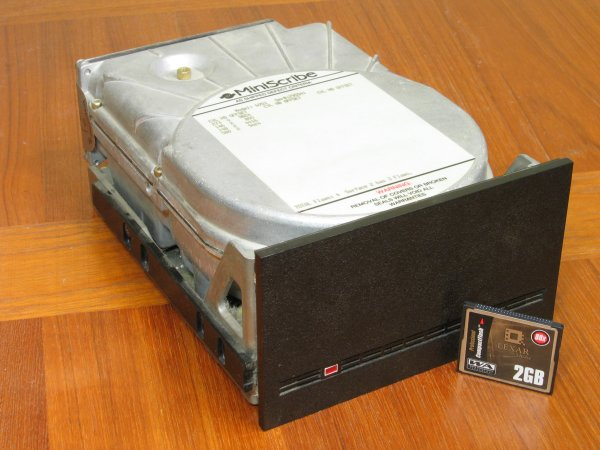
A 44 MB, 5.25-inch full-height MiniScribe hard disk, shown with a more recent 2 GB CompactFlash memory card for size comparison

The company was started by Terry Johnson, who had a 20-year career in the hard drive business at such companies as IBM, Memorex and Storage Technology Corporation. MiniScribe became a major player when it won a series of contracts to supply IBM's PC division, and its subsequent rapid growth led to an initial public offering in late 1983, opening for trading in January 1984. However, slow sales of the IBM PC/XT led IBM to dramatically scale back its orders late that year, forcing MiniScribe to lay off 26% of its staff and causing the value of the stock to plummet. Johnson left the company; at the time he stated that he had been planning to do this for some time and that his departure had "absolutely nothing" to do with IBM. Johnson later said "It's a very low inertia industry, you can blow your way into it and get blown out of it very quickly". Roger Gower, who had been recently promoted to President, took over the CEO role as well.

Shortly thereafter the company was recapitalized with a $20 million investment from Hambrecht & Quist (H&Q), a venture capital firm. One of H&Q's officers was Quentin Thomas ("QT") Wiles, a turnaround specialist nicknamed "Dr. Fix-It". Wiles took over the CEO position from Gower, running the company remotely from his office in Sherman Oaks, Los Angeles, with a management team made up primarily of accountants. The company soon returned to profitability, with sales increasing from $114 million at the height of IBM's orders, to $603 million by 1988, when it was named the most well-managed company in the disk drive industry. Their major customer at this time was Compaq, but the company was also bidding for major contracts with Apple Computer and Digital Equipment Corporation (DEC).

== Fraud and failure ==
In January 1987, the company officers conducted a quick inventory to estimate their accounts prior to an independent review by third party accounting firm Coopers & Lybrand. Their internal inventory count showed that there was a shortfall of between $2 and $4 million. This implied the cost to produce those drives that did sell was higher than initially thought, which, if properly booked against sales, would mean their operating margins would be unimpressive. Instead of reporting this, a number of the managers decided to cover it up by various means. They produced an inflated inventory count, and then broke into the accountants' lock boxes and replaced their independent count to match their newly inflated numbers. The team continued to roll these numbers forward through the quarters, compounding the problem.

In July 1987, Jesse Parker, director of far east operations, told Wiles that something was amiss. In August, Wiles travelled to Hong Kong and Singapore where he found a complete loss of control. The inventory count from that autumn showed that the numbers had grown to $15 million, mostly in Colorado. A report was prepared to consider various solutions, but Wiles suggested that they continue hiding the problem, ordering all copies of the report be destroyed. This led to the company's most infamous cover-up. The managers rented a second warehouse in Colorado, where they personally packed 26,000 bricks into hard drive boxes and shipped them to Singapore to bolster the inventory count. After the count was complete, they recalled those serial numbers as defective units. Instead of writing them off, they checked them into inventory, along with other failed drives that had been returned.

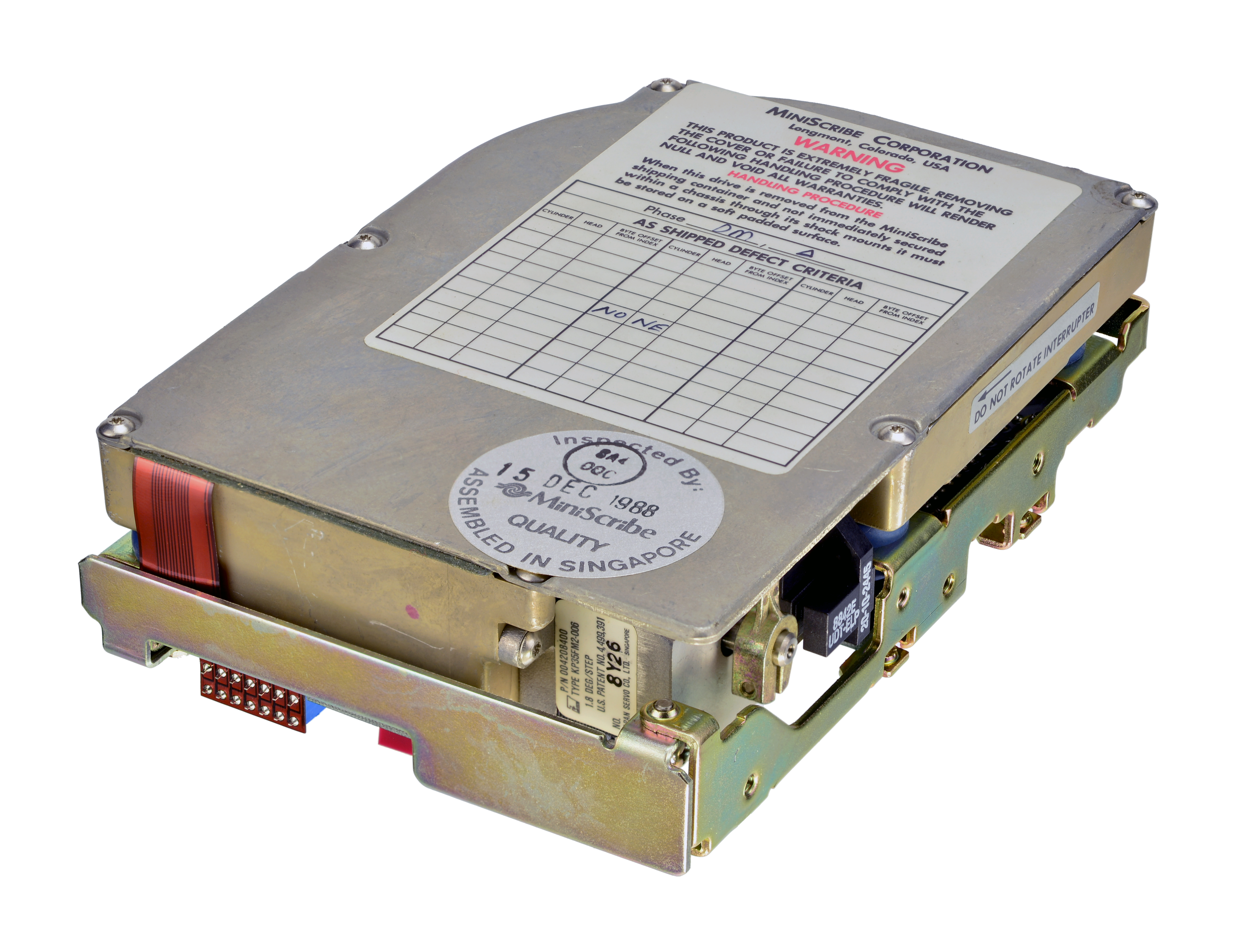
A MiniScribe Model 8425, manufactured on December 15, 1988, nearly a year before MiniScribe's bankruptcy and Maxtor's acquisition

The company continued to post impressive numbers, but there were troubling signs. Among them the company continued to post improving operating margins while the rest of the hard drive industry was suffering from rapidly falling margins due to ongoing downward price pressure. In 1988 the board of directors became concerned when the company's reported receivables grew dramatically, indicating a large amount of unpaid billables, while at the same time inventories were also growing, indicating unsold product. Those two numbers are normally at odds. Increased receivables should indicate increased sales, which would normally result in decreased inventory. The directors began an internal investigation in October, while the company reported another record-setting quarter for that period in spite of failing to win either the Apple or DEC contracts.

The investigation revealed that Wiles set iron-clad sales forecasts and pushed these requirements down into the sales team, leaving no room for failure and setting bonuses on beating those figures. The sales team responded by "touching up" reporting documents as they moved up the reporting chain. Wiles responded to these positive reports by setting even higher sales targets, leading to ever-increasing fraud to meet them. Wiles left the company in February 1989, followed by most of the company's officers over the next months. The directors report was released in the summer, stating that Wiles and his management team had "perpetrated a massive fraud" in a "company run amok".

Among the other techniques used to improve the numbers were classic accounting tricks. Failing to write off bad debts, shipping drives to warehouses and booking them as sales ("channel stuffing"), back-dating shipments to allow them to be booked in earlier reporting periods to meet goals, and deliberately shipping defective products repeatedly to different customers so one drive could be booked as multiple sales (leading employees to joke that the only thing being repaired were the worn-out cardboard boxes). When the company embarked on a round of layoffs just before the 1989 Christmas shutdown, including several of the employees who were involved in the brick scheme, they immediately called the Denver area newspapers, who broke the story. Following immediate investigations in Singapore and Colorado the fraud was confirmed.

== Acquisition and aftermath ==
The company declared bankruptcy on January 1, 1990, and was quickly liquidated with Maxtor acquiring its assets in a $46 million cash and stock deal in 1990. Since then MiniScribe Corporation was known as Maxtor Colorado Corporation and later merged with its parent. In a subsequent court case, Wiles claimed to have known nothing of these schemes, saying he was duped by the middle management. Several of those middle managers testified that Wiles was aware of the fraud. The court also noted that Wiles sold a considerable number of shares in the company in April and May 1988, immediately prior to reporting a shortfall due to an "elaborate scheme" to manipulate inventory shortfalls. Wiles was convicted of fraud and insider trading in July 1994 following a federal jury trial, and sentenced to 36 months imprisonment. A portion of Wiles' conviction was overturned on appeal in 1996.

Founder Terry Johnson later helped found CoData with the intent of building a 3.5" hard drive with the capacity of standard 5.25" drives. The company merged with Conner Peripherals in 1986 and as Conner Peripherals became a major vendor for a time. Johnson died near Norman Wells in northern Canada while piloting his Beechcraft Bonanza on July 24, 2010.
