= ExcelStor Technology =

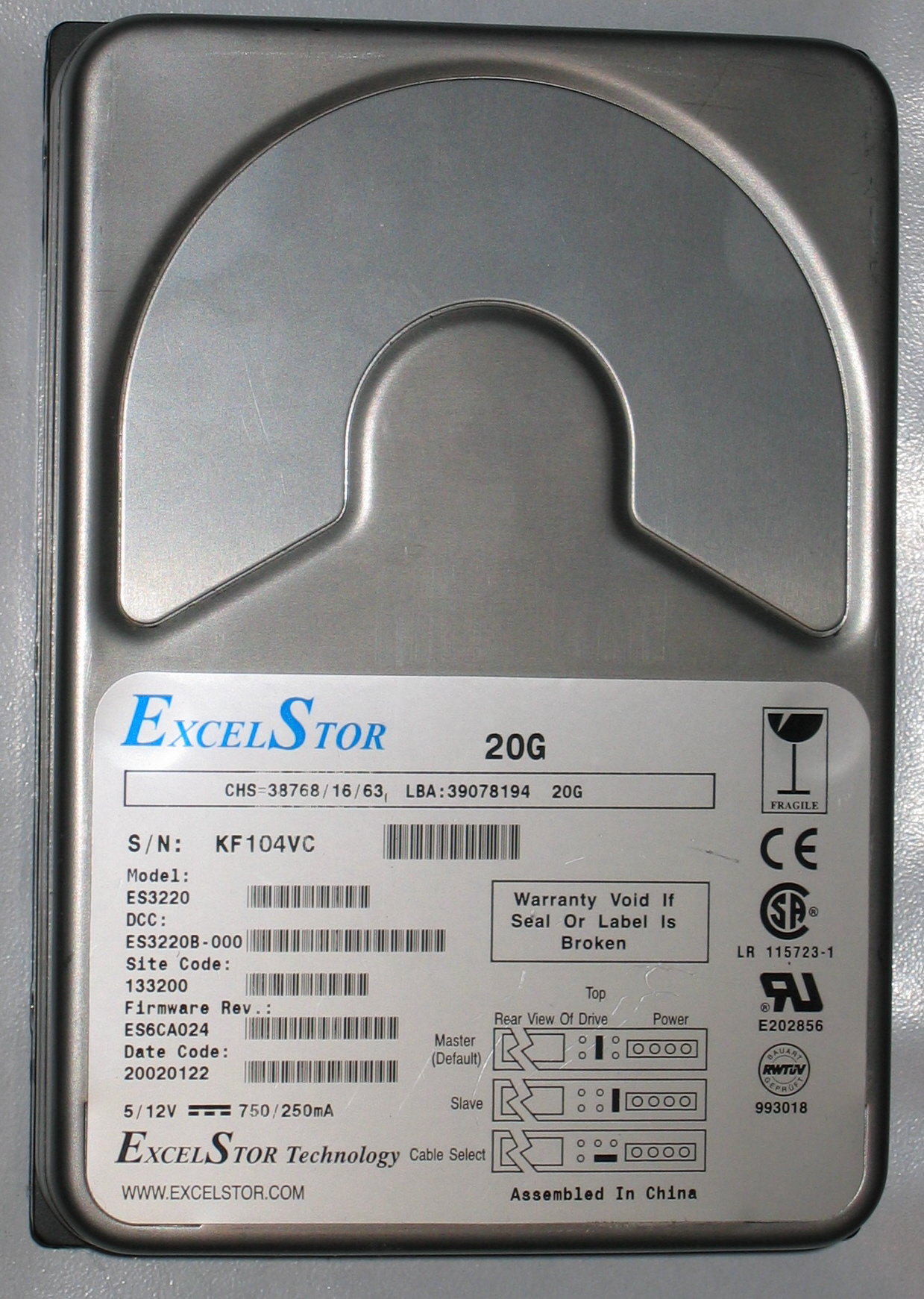
ExcelStor ES3220 20 GB drive

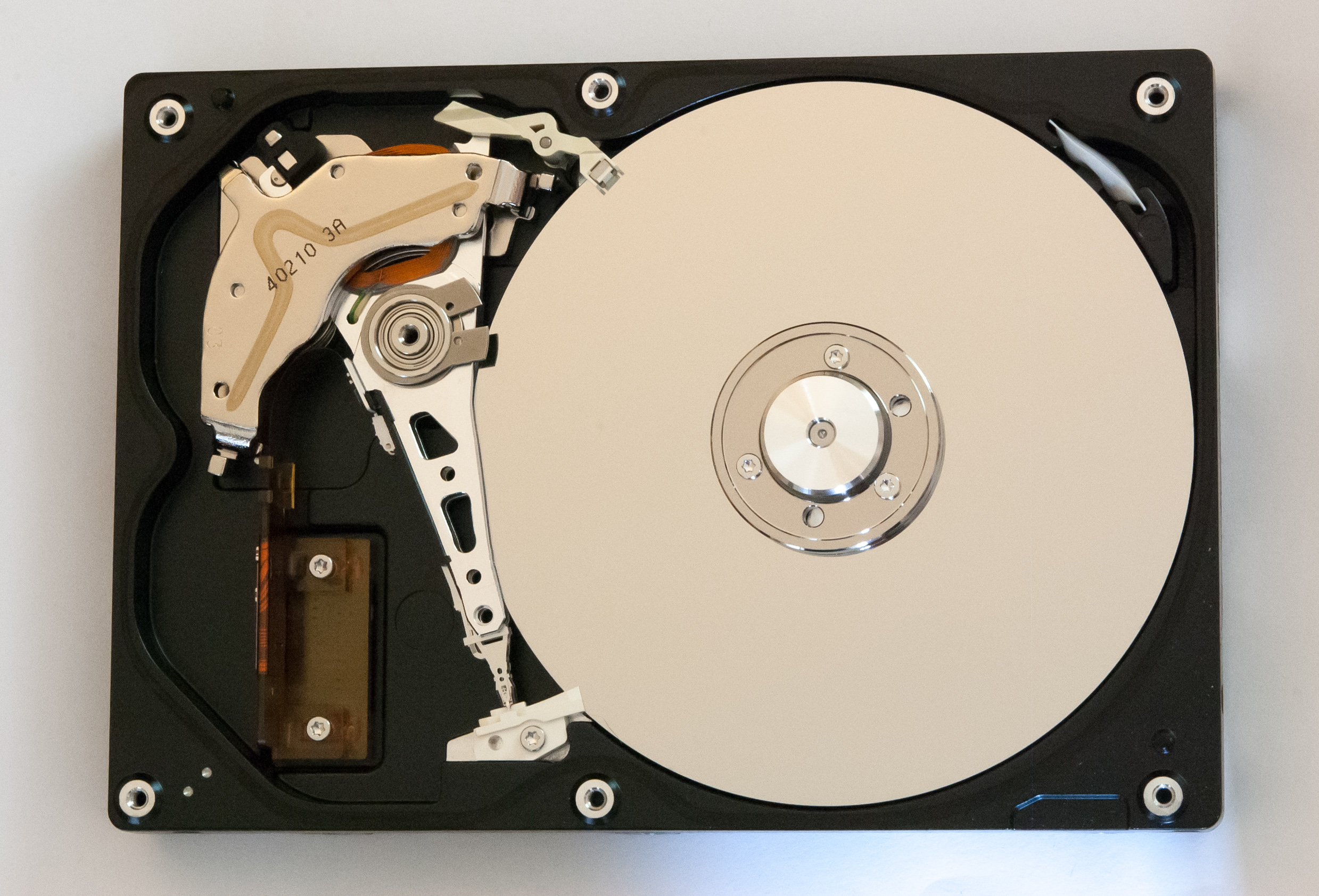
Mechanism of an ExcelStor 80 GB hard disk manufactured in 2004

ExcelStor Technology (Chinese: 易拓科技) was established in 2000 as a small hard disk drive manufacturer and has evolved into a contract manufacturer and a system integrator. ExcelStor bought the bankrupt Conner Technology PLC, its products and factory. It has a manufacturing plant in Shenzhen, China, and an R&D center in Longmont, Colorado, United States. The company is partly owned by Shenzhen Kaifa Technology, of which the major share holder is China Great Wall Computer Group Co.

In 2002, ExcelStor signed a deal with IBM to manufacture and sell the 40 GB version of IBM's Deskstar 120GXP series under the ExcelStor brand name. IBM was also to market these drives under its own brand name. In 2003, after Hitachi took over IBM's storage division, the deal was extended to include 40 GB and 80 GB drives from Hitachi's Deskstar 7K250 series. In addition to regular drives, the company also produced models with unusual firmware features, such as multi-boot management, and backup and restore features.

Since 2004 ExcelStor has manufactured some of Iomega's products, including REV. In 2007 Iomega announced it would acquire ExcelStor in a stock swap valued at approximately $315 million. The deal fell apart, however, with Iomega paying a termination fee of $7.5 million in 2008 as Iomega was being acquired by EMC Corporation.

In 2007, Excelstor laid off 20 of its 28 employees at its Longmont CO R&D Center.
