= Conner Peripherals =

Defunct computer storage company

Conner Peripherals, Inc.
- Company type: Private
- Industry: Hard disk drives
- Founded: June 1985; 40 years ago in San Jose, California, United States
- Founder: Finis Conner
- Defunct: 1996
- Fate: Acquired by Seagate Technology
- Headquarters: San Jose, California, United States

Conner Peripherals, Inc. (commonly referred to as Conner), was a company that manufactured hard drives and tape drives for personal computers. Conner Peripherals was founded in 1985 by Seagate Technology co-founder and San Jose State University alumnus Finis Conner (1943– ). In 1986, it merged with CoData, a Colorado start-up founded by MiniScribe founders Terry Johnson and John Squires. CoData was developing a new type of small hard disk that put the capacity of a 5.25-inch drive into the smaller (and now commonplace) 3.5-inch format.

== Hard disks ==
=== Design concepts ===
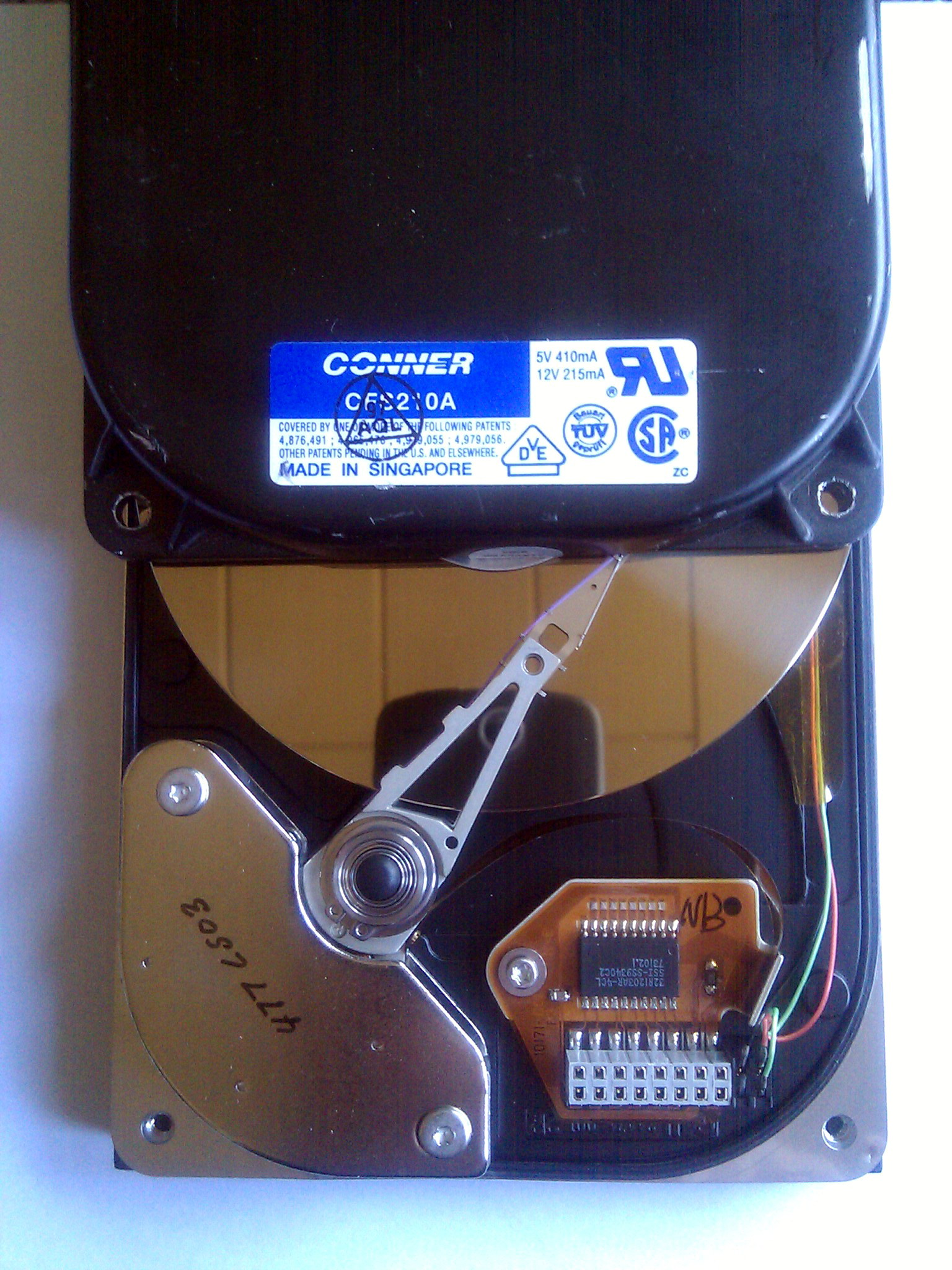
Conner Peripherals HDD with 213 MB capacity

Conner's drives were notable for eschewing the "tub" type of head-disk assembly, where the disks are inside a large base casting shaped like a square bowl or vault with a flat lid; instead, they preferred the flat base plate approach, which was more resistant to shock and less likely to warp or deform when heated. Their first drives had the base plate carrying the disks, head arm and actuator enclosed inside a long aluminum cartridge, fixed to a bulkhead on the other side with two screws and sealed with a large, square O-ring. Conner's 1/3-height (1-inch thick) drives used a domed, cast aluminum lid with four screws, one on each corner, sealed to the base plate with a rubber gasket. The printed circuit board was bolted to the bottom of the base plate, with the mounting holes for the drive drilled into tabs cast into the sides of the base plate. This design would be Conner's trademark look well into the 1990s.

Logically, Conner's drives had some of the characteristics of the original MiniScribe drives (of which John Squires had also been a designer), with a large amount of intelligence built into the drive's central processing unit (CPU); Conner drives used a single Motorola 68HC11 microcontroller, and ran a proprietary real-time operating system that implemented the track-following algorithms (the "servo" system) in software, as well as managing the bus interface.

== Corporate history ==
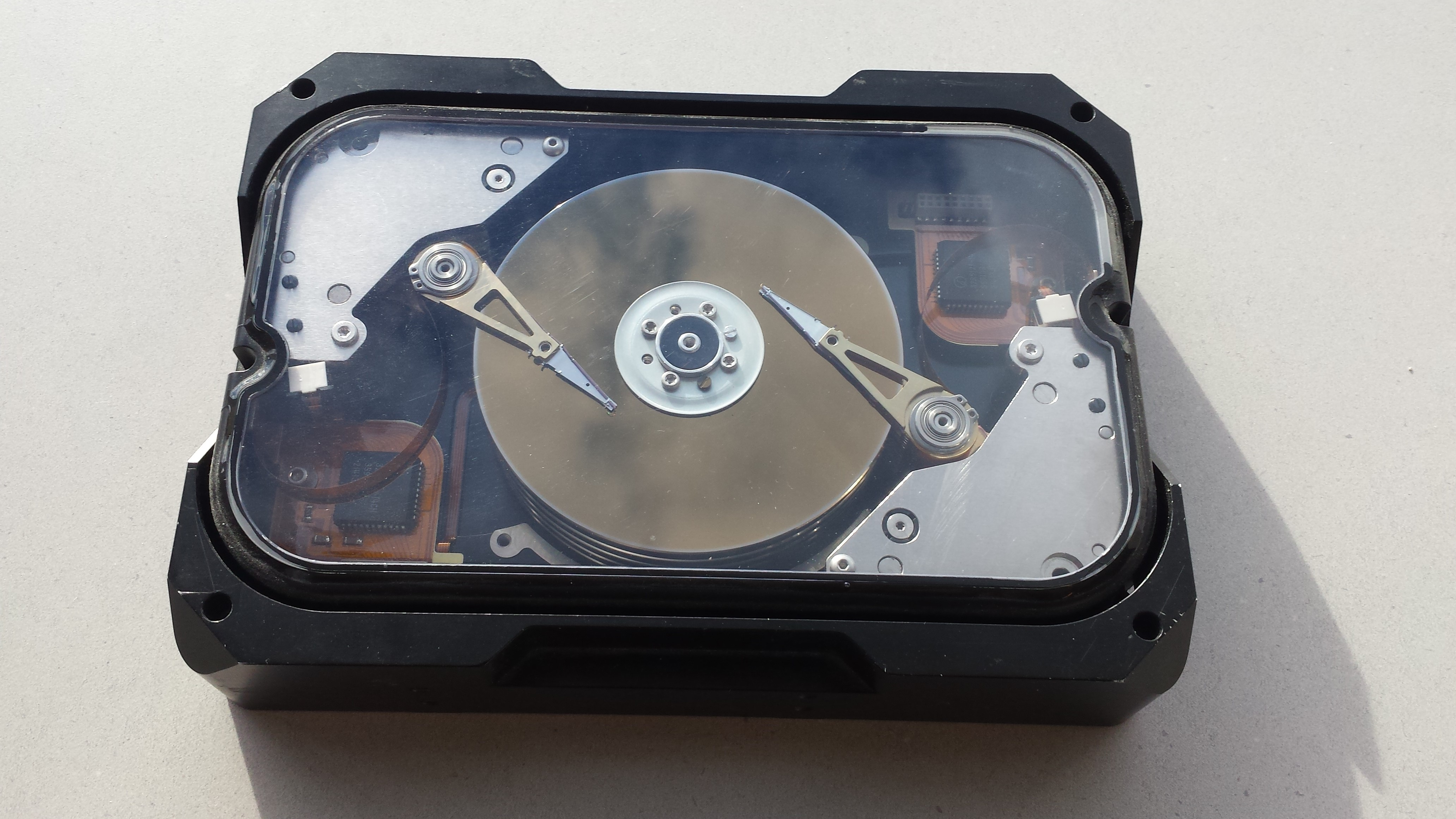
Conner Peripherals "Chinook" drive with clear top cover

Conner Peripherals was founded in June 1985 and located in San Jose CA. However it did not produce any product until after it merged into and with CoData, Boulder, Colorado, in February 1986. It began shipping its first products based upon the CoData design in early 1987, initially to Compaq. During calendar 1987 Compaq represented about 90% of Conner Peripheral's sales.

In 1990, Conner Peripherals set a record by reaching $1.337 billion in sales in four years, without acquisitions, making it the fastest-growing manufacturing start-up in United States history.

In December 1992 Conner Peripherals acquired Archive Corporation adding Archive's tape drives to its product line.

Conner Peripherals was acquired by Seagate in a 1996 merger.
