= Seagate Technology =

American data storage company

Seagate Technology Holdings plc

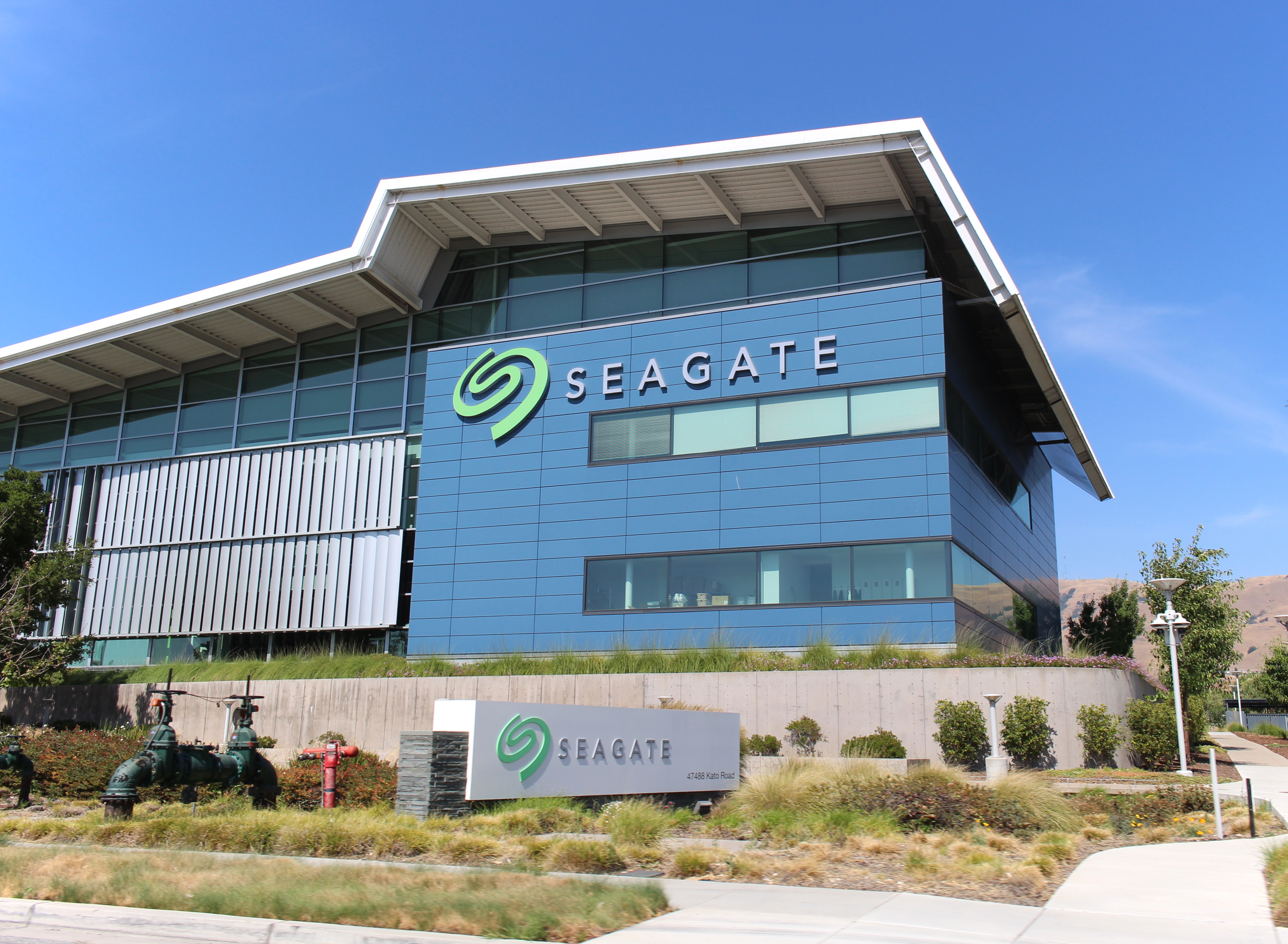
- Operational headquarters in Fremont, California
- Type: Public
- Traded as: Nasdaq: STX; Nasdaq-100 component; S&P 500 component
- Industry: Computer storage
- Predecessor: Shugart Technology
- Founded: November 1, 1978; 48 years ago (as Shugart Technology)
- Founders: Alan Shugart; Tom Mitchell; Doug Mahon; Finis Conner; Syed Iftikar
- Headquarters: Fremont, California, United States (operational); Dublin, Ireland (legal domicile)
- Area served: Worldwide
- Key people: Dave Mosley (chairman & CEO)
- Products: Hard disk drives; hybrid drives; solid-state drives
- Revenue: ▲US$9.10 billion (2025)
- Operating income: ▲US$1.89 billion (2025)
- Net income: ▲US$1.47 billion (2025)
- Total assets: ▲US$8.02 billion (2025)
- Total equity: ▲ −US$453 million (2025)
- Number of employees: 30,000 (2025)
- Subsidiaries: LaCie
- Website: seagate.com
- Footnotes; Financials as of June 27, 2025.

Seagate Technology Holdings plc is an international data storage company. It was incorporated in 1978 as Shugart Technology and commenced business in 1979. Since 2010, the company has been incorporated in Dublin, Ireland, with operational headquarters in Fremont, California, United States.

Seagate developed the first 5.25-inch hard disk drive (HDD), the 5-megabyte ST-506, in 1980. They were a major supplier in the microcomputer market during the 1980s, especially after the introduction of the IBM XT in 1983. Much of its growth has come through its acquisition of competitors. In 1989, Seagate acquired Control Data Corporation's Imprimis division, the makers of CDC's HDD products. Seagate acquired Conner Peripherals in 1996, Maxtor in 2006, and Samsung's HDD business in 2011. Today, Seagate, along with its competitor Western Digital, dominates the HDD market.

Seagate Technology operates manufacturing and R&D operations in Thailand, with locations in Teparuk, Samut Prakan, and Korat, Nakhon Ratchasima. The facilities employ approximately 14,000 to 15,000 people, representing nearly half of the company's global workforce.

== History ==
First Seagate logo and wordmark, used from 1986 to 2002

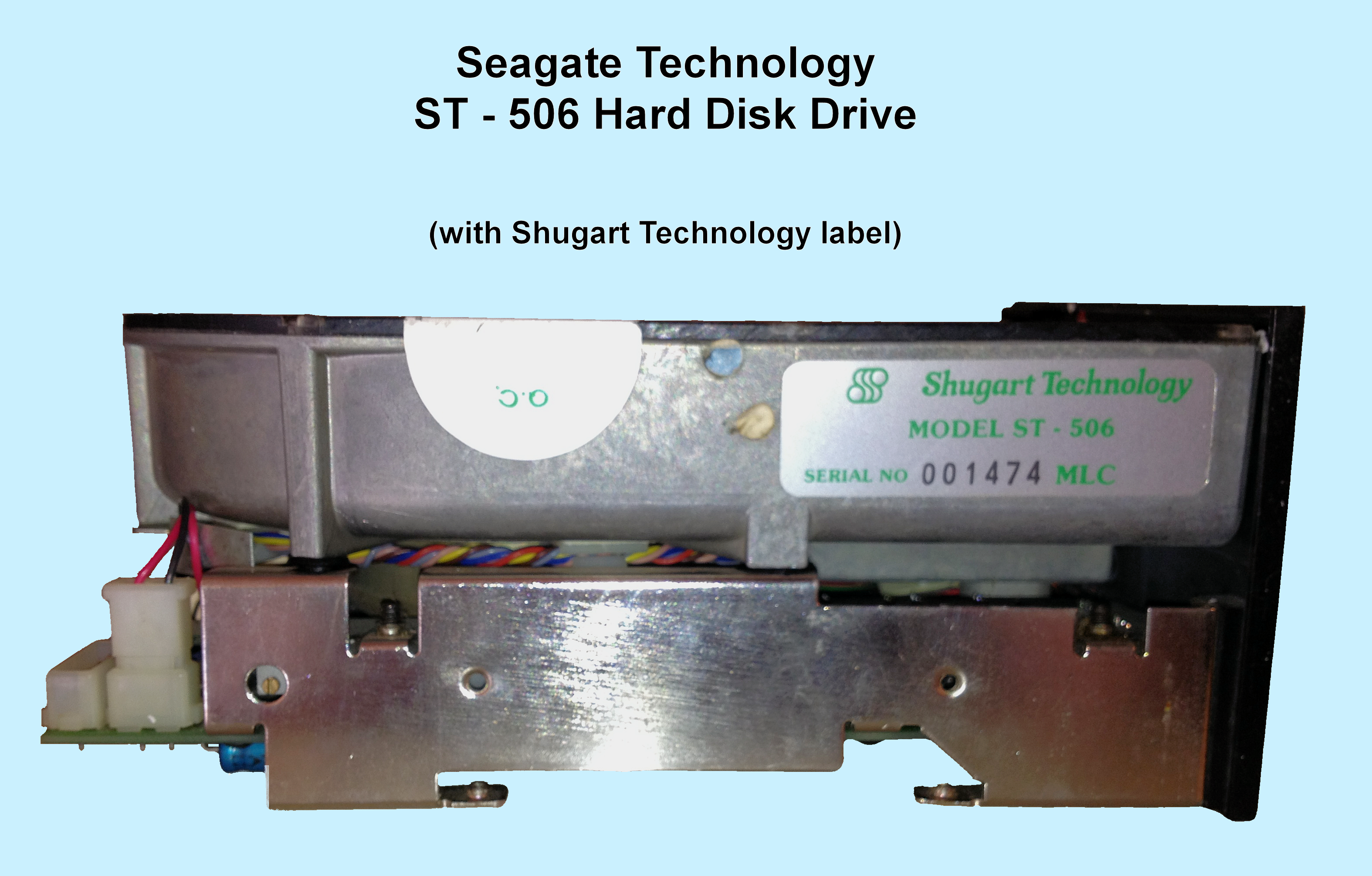
Seagate ST-506

=== Founding as Shugart Technology ===
Seagate Technology (then called Shugart Technology) was incorporated on November 1, 1978, and commenced operations with co-founders Al Shugart, Tom Mitchell, Doug Mahon, Finis Conner, and Syed Iftikar in October 1979 in Scotts Valley, California. The company came into being when Conner approached Shugart with the idea of starting a new company to develop 5.25-inch HDDs which Conner predicted would be a coming economic boom in the disk drive market. To avoid a lawsuit from Xerox's subsidiary Shugart Associates (also founded by Shugart), the name was changed to Seagate Technology while retaining the letters S, G and T from Shugart.

=== Early history and Tom Mitchell era ===
The company's first product, the ST-506, with a storage capacity of 5 megabytes (MB), was released in 1980. It was the first hard disk to fit the 5.25-inch form factor of the Shugart mini-floppy drive. It used a Modified Frequency Modulation (MFM) encoding and in the following year released a 10 MB version, the ST-412. With this, Seagate secured a contract as a major OEM supplier for the IBM XT, IBM's first personal computer to contain a hard disk. The large volumes of units sold to IBM fueled Seagate's early growth. In its first year, Seagate shipped $10 million worth of units to consumers. By 1983, the company shipped over 200,000 units for revenues of $110 million.

In 1983, Al Shugart was replaced as president by the chief operating officer, Tom Mitchell, in order to move forward with corporate restructuring in the face of a changing market. Shugart continued to oversee corporate planning. By this point, the company had a 45% market share of the single-user hard drive market, with IBM purchasing 60% of the total business Seagate was doing at the time.

In 1989, Seagate acquired Imprimis Technology, the disk storage division of Control Data Corporation, resulting in a combined market share of 43%. Seagate benefited from Imprimis' head technology and reputation while Imprimis gained access to Seagate's lower component and manufacturing costs.

=== Second Al Shugart era (1990s) ===
In September 1991, Tom Mitchell resigned as president under pressure from the board of directors, with Al Shugart reassuming presidency of the company. Shugart refocused the company on its more lucrative markets, and on mainframe drives instead of external drives. He also pulled away from outsourcing component production overseas. This allowed Seagate to better keep up with demand for PCs, which increased extremely rapidly in 1993 across the market. This included a domestic partnership with Corning Inc., which began using a new glass-ceramic compound to manufacture disk substrates. In 1991, Seagate also introduced the Barracuda HDD, the industry's first hard disk with a 7,200 RPM spindle speed.

In May 1993, Seagate became the first company to cumulatively ship 50 million HDDs over its firm's history. The following year, Seagate Technology Inc moved from the Nasdaq stock exchange to the New York Stock Exchange, trading under the ticker symbol SEG. Upon leaving, the company was the 17th-largest company in terms of trading volume on the Nasdaq exchange. In 1996, Seagate merged with Conner Peripherals to form the world's largest independent hard-drive manufacturer. Following the merger, the company began a system of consolidating the components and production methods within its production chain of factories in order to streamline how products were built between plants.

In May 1995, Seagate Technology acquired Frye Computer Systems, a software company based in Boston, Massachusetts. This company developed the LAN monitoring software kit The Frye Utilities for Networks, which won PC Magazine's "Editor's Choice" award in 1995.

In 1996, Seagate introduced the industry's first hard disk with a 10,000 RPM spindle speed, the Cheetah 4LP. By 2000, this product increased to a speed of 15,000 RPM with the release of the Cheetah 15X. In May 1997, the High Court of Justice in England awarded Amstrad PLC $93 million in a lawsuit over reportedly faulty disk drives Seagate sold to Amstrad, a British manufacturer and marketer of personal computers. That year, Seagate also introduced the first Fibre Channel interface hard drive.

In July 1997, Seagate Technology agreed to acquire San Jose, California-based startup Quinta Corporation for up to $325 million ($230 million in cash plus up to $95 million in performance milestones). Quinta developed Optically Assisted Winchester (OAW) laser technology purported to bypass traditional magnetic storage limits and thereby increase hard drive data density

In 1997, Seagate experienced a downturn, along with the rest of the industry. In July 1998, Shugart resigned his positions with the company. Stephen J. "Steve" Luczo became the new chief executive officer, also joining the board of directors.

=== First Steve Luczo era (1998–2004) ===
Luczo joined Seagate Technology in October 1993 as Senior Vice President of Corporate Development. In March 1995, he was appointed Executive Vice President of Corporate Development and chief operating officer of Seagate Software Holdings. In 1996, Luczo led the Seagate acquisition of Conner Peripherals, creating the world's largest disk drive manufacturer and completing the company's strategy of vertical integration and ownership of key disk drive components. In September 1997, he was promoted to the positions of President and Chief Operating Officer.

In 1998, the board appointed Luczo as the new CEO and Seagate launched a restructuring effort. Historically, Seagate's design centers had been organized around function, with one product line manager in charge of tracking the progress of all programs. In 1998, Luczo and CTO Tom Porter called for an organizational redesign of design centers into core teams focused on individual projects, in order to meet the corporate objective of faster time to market. As the CEO, Luczo decided to increase investment in technology and to diversify into faster-growing, higher-margin businesses. He decided to implement a highly automated platform strategy for manufacturing. Between 1997 and 2004, Seagate reduced its headcount from approximately 111,000 to approximately 50,000, reduced its manufacturing factories from 24 to 11, and reduced design centers from seven to three. During this period, Seagate's output increased from approximately 9 million drives per quarter to approximately 20 million drives per quarter.

In 1998, the company's Seagate Research facility was also established in Pittsburgh, a $30 million investment that focused on future technologies and prototypes. Technology developed by the facility would include devices like the hard drive disk for Microsoft's first Xbox.

In 1999, Seagate shipped its 250 millionth hard drive.

In May 1999, Seagate sold its Network & Storage Management Group (NSMG) to Veritas Software in return for 155 million shares of Veritas' stock. With this deal, Seagate became the largest shareholder in Veritas, with an ownership stake of more than 40%.

=== Re-privatization (2000) ===
In 2000, Seagate became a private company again. Luczo led a management buyout of Seagate, believing that Seagate needed to make significant capital investments to achieve its goals. He decided to turn the company private, since disk drive producers had a hard time obtaining capital for long-term projects. The company was incorporated in Grand Cayman and stayed private until it re-entered the public market in 2002.

In early November 1999, Luczo met with representatives of Silver Lake Partners to discuss a major restructuring of Seagate. After two failed attempts to increase Seagate's stock price and unlock its value from Veritas, Seagate's board of directors authorized Luczo to seek advice from Morgan Stanley in October 1999. In early November 1999, Morgan Stanley arranged a meeting between Seagate executives and representatives of Silver Lake Partners. On November 22, 2000, Seagate management, Veritas Software, and an investor group led by Silver Lake closed a complex deal that privatized Seagate. At the time, this was the largest buyout ever of a technology company. The total deal, worth about $20 billion, included the sale of its disk-drive operations for $2 billion to an investor group led by Silver Lake Partners. The goal of the deal was to unlock the value of the 33% ownership stake Seagate had in Veritas, which had put the value of Seagate's stock at around $33 billion even though its market cap was only $15 billion.

Following the relocation to the Cayman Islands in 2000, the legal name of a holding company was simplified to Seagate Technology. The de facto operational company, incorporated in Delaware, became a limited liability company (LLC) named Seagate Technology LLC and operates to this day as such.

Both the Stanford Graduate School of Business and the Harvard Business School have written multiple case studies on the Seagate buyout and turnaround. In addition, several leading management books cite the Seagate turnaround.

=== Re-emerging as a public company (2002–2010) ===
Luczo became the chairman of the board of directors of Seagate Technology on June 19, 2002. In 2003, he accepted an invitation from the New York Stock Exchange to join its Listed Companies Advisory Committee.

In 2003, Seagate re-entered the HDD market for notebook computers and provided the 1-inch hard drives for the first iPods. This led to a trend of digital devices being created with progressively more and more memory, especially in cameras and music devices. In September 2004, The New York Times called Seagate "the nation's top maker of hard drives used to store data in computers", following the company forecasting its quarterly revenue above Wall Street estimates.

In 2004, the company separated the roles of chairman and CEO. Luczo resigned as the Seagate CEO on July 3, but retained his position as chairman of the board of directors. Bill Watkins became CEO.

At the beginning of 2006, Forbes magazine named Seagate its Company of the Year as the best managed company in the United States. Forbes wrote that, "Seagate is riding the world's gadget boom. Its 1-inch drives are the archives for cameras and MP3 players." It also credited Seagate as being the company that "sparked the personal computer revolution 25 years ago with the first 5.25-inch hard drive for the PC".

In April 2006, Seagate announced the first professional Direct-To-Disc digital cinema professional video camera aimed at the independent filmmaking market. This technology used Seagate's HDDs.

In 2007, Seagate created the hybrid drive concept.

In 2007, Seagate announced the "phase out" of parallel ATA hard disk drives by early 2008.

In April 2008, Seagate was the first to ship one billion HDDs. According to CNET, it took 17 years to ship the first 100 million and 15 years to ship the next 900 million. In 2009, Bill Watkins was released from employment as CEO.

On August 27, 2008, Seagate's stock listing was transferred to the NASDAQ Global Select Market (NASDAQ-GS large cap), trading under the same ticker symbol, STX.

=== Second Steve Luczo era (2009–2017) ===
In January 2009, Luczo was asked by the Seagate Board to return as CEO of the company, replacing Bill Watkins. As of the date of his hiring, Seagate was losing market share, facing rapidly declining revenues, was lagging in product delivery with high manufacturing costs, had an excessive operating expense structure, and had $2 billion of debt that was due within two years. The company's market value was less than $1.5 billion.

Luczo revamped the entire management team, and quickly reorganized the company back to a functional structure after a failed attempt to organize by business units in 2007. Led by a new Head of Sales (Dave Mosley), a new head of Operations and Development (Bob Whitmore), and a new CFO (Pat O'Malley), the team worked to address the multitude of challenges that it faced. By the end of 2009, the company had refinanced its debt and had begun to turn around its operations. In 2010, Seagate reinstated its dividend and began a stock buyback plan.

In 2010, Seagate announced that it was moving its headquarters and most of its staff from Scotts Valley to Cupertino, California.

In June 2010, Seagate released the world's first 3 TB hard drive. That September, Seagate released the first portable 1.5 TB hard drive.

In July 2011, the company changed its country of incorporation from the Cayman Islands to Ireland. Since then, the holding company became a public limited company (PLC) named Seagate Technology plc.

In December 2011, Seagate acquired Samsung's HDD business. Seagate also acquired a license to use Samsung trademark on HDD products for five years; after license expired, Seagate rebranded all Samsung-branded external HDD products to Maxtor, a company that Seagate acquired at the end of 2005. After the acquisition, internal HDDs from former Samsung factories were simultaneously branded as Samsung and Seagate, and then were exclusively branded as Seagate.

In 2012, Seagate continued to raise its dividend and repurchased nearly 30% of the company's outstanding shares. In the fiscal year ending June 2012, Seagate had achieved record revenues, record gross margins, record profits, and regained its position as the largest disc drive manufacturer. Its market value had increased to over $14 billion. In March 2012, Seagate demonstrated the first 1 TB/square inch density hard drive, with the possibility of scaling up to 60 TB by 2030.

In 2013, Seagate was the first HDD company to begin shipment of shingled magnetic recording drives, announcing in September that it had already shipped over 1 million such drives.

In February 2016, Seagate received a class action lawsuit concerning defective hard drives.

In August 2016, Seagate demonstrated its 60 TB SSD—claimed to be "the largest SSD ever demonstrated"—at the Flash Memory Summit in Santa Clara.

In January 2017, Seagate announced the shutdown of one of its largest HDD assembly plants, located in Suzhou, China. The plant became part of Seagate after Maxtor's acquisition in 2006; Maxtor started producing hard drives in Suzhou in 2004.

=== Dave Mosley era (2017–present) ===
On July 25, 2017, David "Dave" Mosley was appointed CEO, effective from October 1, 2017 after longtime CEO, Steve Luczo stepped down and became executive chairman.

In June 2018, Seagate was honored at the 14th Annual Manufacturing Leadership Awards Gala in Huntington Beach, California. In 2018, Seagate invested in Series A and B of Ripple, an enterprise blockchain company.

In 2019, Seagate invested £47 million in a research and development project at its factory in Derry, Northern Ireland.

In 2020, Seagate announced that it was moving its headquarters and most of its staff from Cupertino to Fremont, California. From May to June that year, the company laid off 500 employees across 12 countries due to a push for better operational efficiencies. Seagate planned for the rearrangement of more resources, including combining facilities in Minnesota.

In September 2020, Seagate announced it had entered the object storage business and introduced CORTX, an open-source object storage software, Lyve Rack, a reference architecture based on CORTX, and a corresponding developer community. The community is a group of open-source researchers and developers working to advance mass-capacity object storage. CORTX open-source software is hosted for download and collaboration on GitHub.

As of May 18, 2021, the new Irish public limited company Seagate Technology Holdings plc became the publicly traded parent company of Seagate, replacing "Seagate Technology plc".

In November 2021, at the Open Compute Summit, Seagate demonstrated the industry's first HDD with a non-volatile memory express (NVMe) interface. This was unusual because HDDs operate far below the capabilities of the NVMe interface, which is usually associated with faster storage media like SSDs.

In May 2022, Seagate presented and demonstrated its LiDAR system at the Autosens conference in Detroit. In February 2023, it divested its LiDAR division to Luminar Technologies.

In October 2022, Seagate announced a restructuring plan to reduce headcount by 8%, equivalent to approximately 3,000 jobs.

On January 17, 2024, Seagate announced the release of the first 30 TB HDD with the Exos Mozaic 3+ HDD series. The series utilizes Heat-Assisted Magnetic Recording (HAMR) and Shingled Magnetic Recording (SMR) technology with an areal density of 3 TB per platter. The 30 TB Mozaic 3+ drive uses ten platters, only one more than the 16 TB Exos X16. Seagate plans to ramp capacity of its HAMR drives, eventually reaching an areal density of 5 TB per platter by 2028. Seagate claims the new drives will have a cheaper cost per TB compared to existing drive models. The series was initially only available to enterprise markets, but is available to end users as of mid of July 2025.

In February 2025, Seagate announced it would acquire HDD equipment maker Intevac for $119 million in an all-cash deal.

In March 2026, Mozaic 4+ HAMR platform, 44TB (4.4TB per disc), Gen 2 superlattice platinum-alloy media, Gen 2 plasmonic writer, Gen 8 spintronic reader, 7nm integrated controller, hyperscale production environments.

== Products ==
=== Internal SSD and HDD storage ===
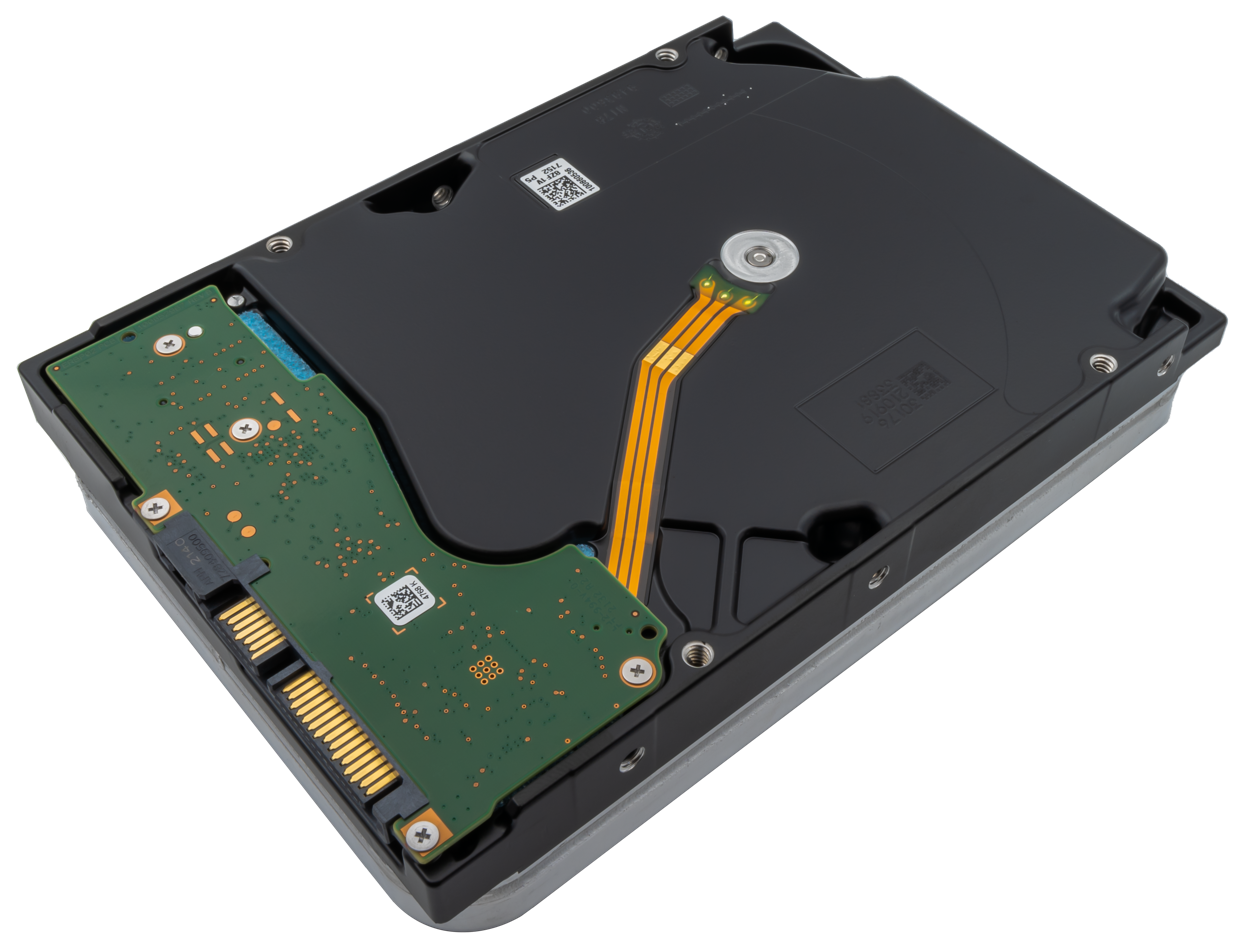
Back of a Seagate EXOS X18 18 TB HDD

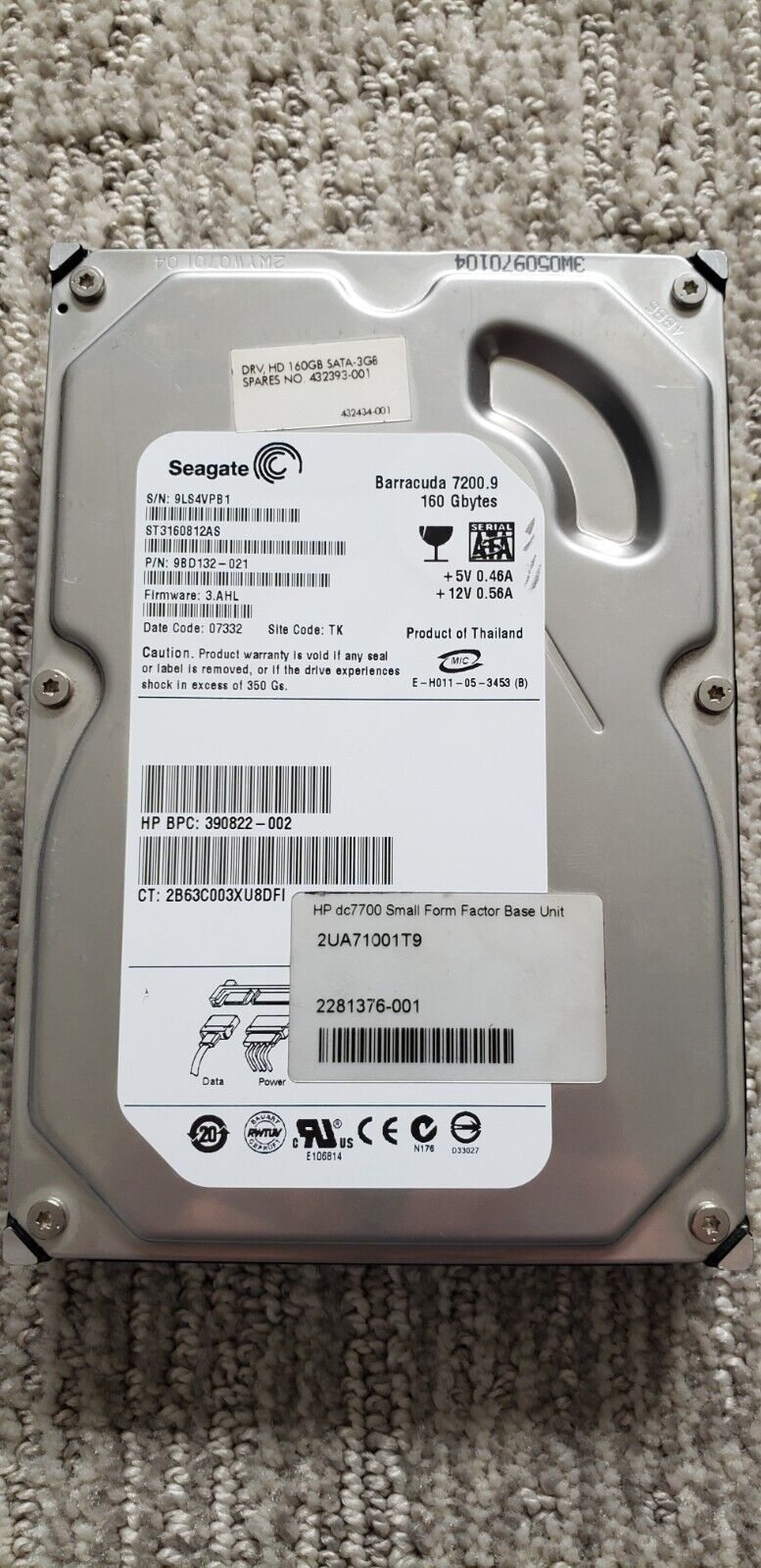
Seagate Barracuda HDD 160GB Model ST3160812AS

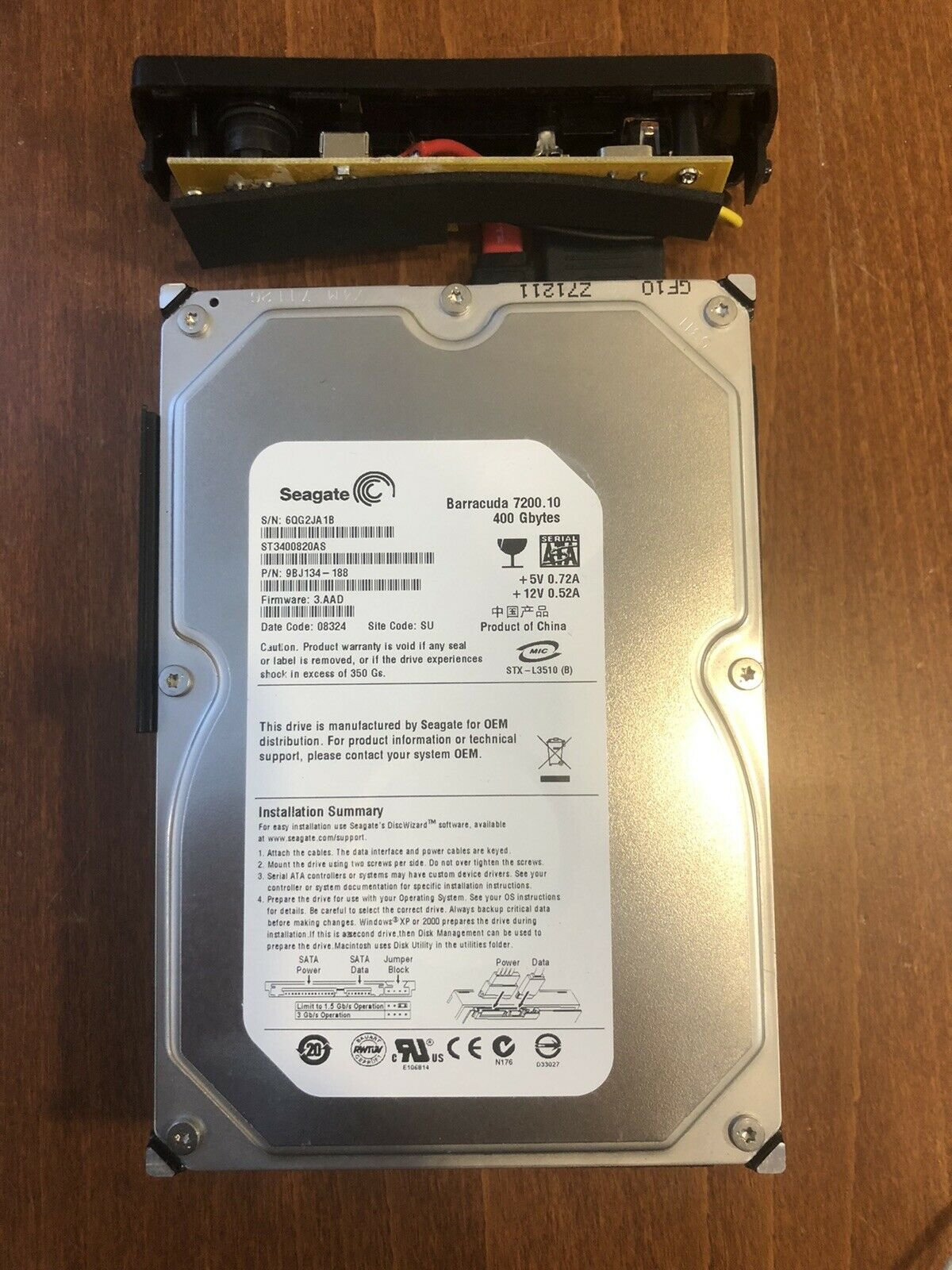
Seagate Barracuda HDD 400GB Model ST3400820AS

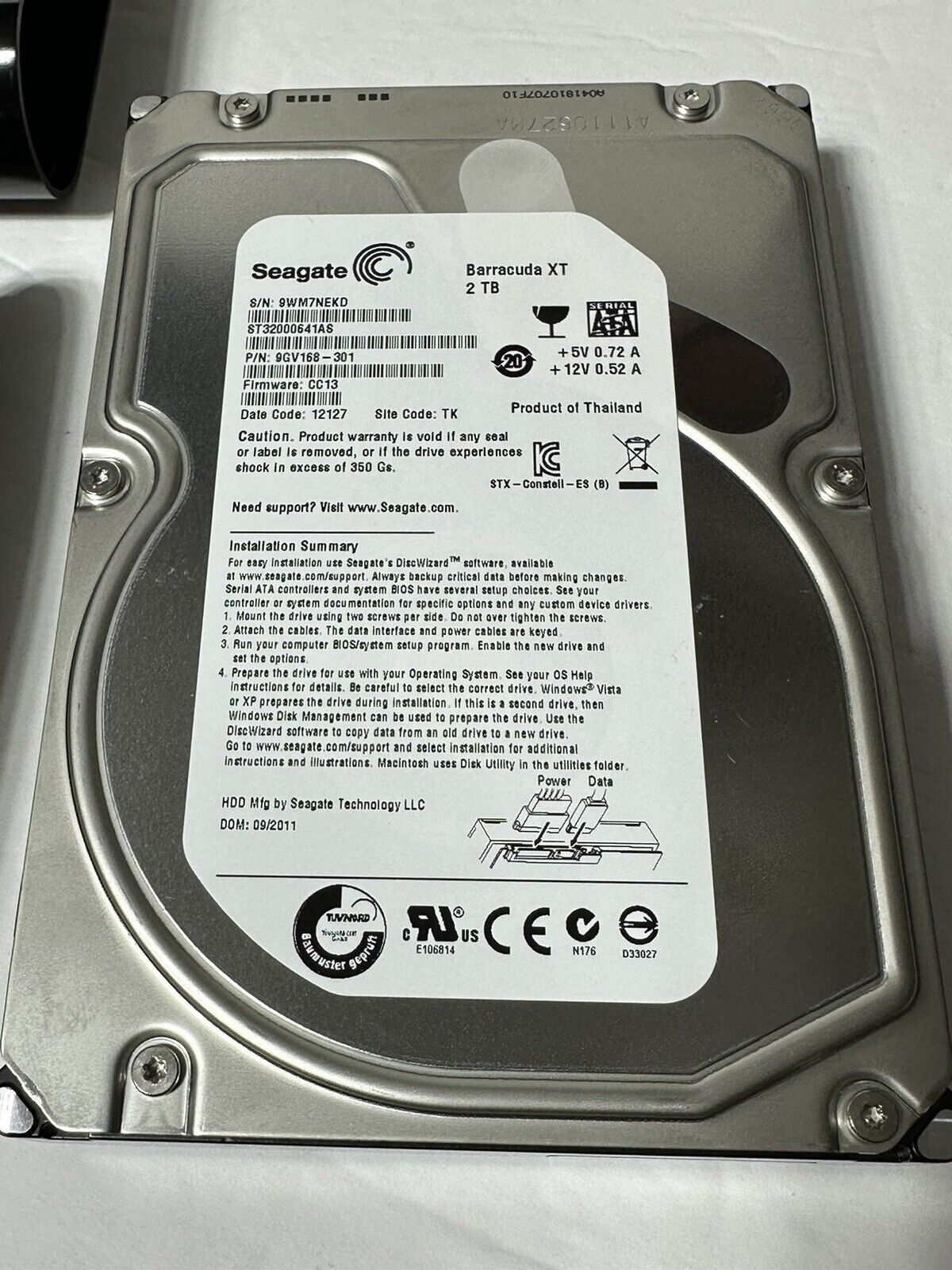
Seagate Barracuda Xt HDD 2TB Model ST32000641AS

Seagate offers various internal solid-state drive (SSD) and hard disk drive (HDD) products that are classed by name for their intended usage:

- Barracuda – Seagate's most popular and inexpensive general-usage SSDs and HDDs meant for devices such as computers, laptops, gaming consoles, and set-top boxes. The Barracuda HDD series has speeds of 5,200–7,200 RPM, storage capacities of 500 GB – 8 TB, with max speeds up to 190 MB/s. The Barracuda SSDs come with either SATA or NVMe interface, storage sizes from 240 GB – 2 TB, and read speeds up to 560 MB/s for SATA and 3,400 MB/s for NVMe.
- Firecuda – For gaming usage in computers, laptops, and gaming consoles. Seagate offers internal and external Firecuda SSDs and HDDs with SATA, NVMe, or USB-C interface with storage capacity between 250 GB – 16 TB.
- Ironwolf – NAS device storage drives, with HDD storage capacities of 1–20 TB, regular or helium drive type, SATA interface, and up to 260 MB/s. Ironwolf SSDs have capacities of 240 GB – 4 TB, SATA or NVMe interface, and speeds up to 560 MB/s for SATA and 3,150 MB/s for NVMe. A 32TB IronWolf "Pro" drive was released to Japanese retail in December 2025.
- Skyhawk – Surveillance system recording drives for use in devices like DVRs or NVRs that come in 2 series. The first series, the Skyhawk AI, has capacities of 8–18 TB, regular or helium drive type, CMR recording technology, and speeds up to 260 MB/s. A 32 TB variant, with speeds up to 285 MB/s, was released in January 2026. The regular Skyhawk series has capacities of 1–8 TB, regular drive type, CMR or SMR recording technology, and speeds up to 210 MB/s.
- Exos – Enterprise drives for usage in datacenters, with three series offered:
  1. Exos E – capacities of 300 GB – 8 TB, SAS or SATA interface, and speeds up to 300 MB/s.
  2. Exos X – capacities of 12–20 TB, helium drive type, SAS or SATA interface, and speeds up to 524 MB/s on certain models.
  3. Exos Mozaic 3+ – 30TB+ capacity, 7200 RPM spindle speed and 512 MB cache. Was introduced in 2023 with less storage as Exos X. Mozaic 3+ will be sold not only to enterprise customers but also to end users, no specialised hardware is needed to read.
- Nytro – Series of enterprise Serial Attached SCSI Solid State Drives, with capacities up to 15 TB.

=== External SSD and HDD storage ===
Seagate offers various external storage product series for computers and laptops:

- Seagate Basic External HDDs
- Backup Plus External HDDs
- Backup Plus Hub External HDDs
- Photo Drive External HDDs
- Barracuda Fast External SSDs
- Seagate Expansion External SSD and HDDs
- One Touch External SSD and HDDs
- Ultra Touch External SSD and HDDs

=== Gaming console storage ===
Seagate has partnered with both PlayStation and Xbox to offer various storage devices for the PlayStation 4, Xbox One and Xbox Series X/S. For the PlayStation 4 and Xbox One Series, Seagate offers the "Game Drive" which is a 2–4 TB USB 3.0 external hard drive. Additionally for the Xbox One series, Seagate now offers a "New Game Drive" in capacities of 2–5 TB and a "Game Drive Hub" which has a capacity up to 8 TB, both of which also use the USB 3.0 interface. During the development of the new Xbox Series X/S, Seagate partnered with Xbox to make a proprietary SSD expansion card that is inserted into the back of the console, available in a capacity of 1 TB, 2 TB and 4 TB.

=== Lyve Cloud ===
Lyve Cloud is a cloud-based storage service first offered by Seagate in February 2021. It was developed in partnership with Equinix and is intended for enterprise usage.

=== Data storage systems ===
Seagate offers various data storage systems for enterprises such as "compute & storage convergence platforms" and flash, hybrid, and disk arrays.

In June 2021, Seagate introduces the Exos CORVAULT, a 4U block storage system with dual storage controllers powered by Seagate's own VelosCT chip. The storage array uses Advanced Distributed Autonomic Protection Technology (ADAPT) and Autonomous Drive Regeneration (ADR) for automating maintenance and thus reducing e-waste.

=== Legacy product lines ===
Some of Seagate's old product lines that are no longer produced include:

- U-Series – Lower performance, cheaper desktop HDDs introduced in the late 1990s.
- Medalist – A line of mainstream HDDs for use in desktops and more. Later replaced by the Barracuda series.
- Cheetah – High speed & performance HDDs with speeds of 10,000–15,000 RPM. Discontinued in the late 2000s.
- Momentus – High performance laptop HDDs.
- Decathlon – High performance desktop hard disk drives that were popular but expensive at the time.

== Corporate affairs ==
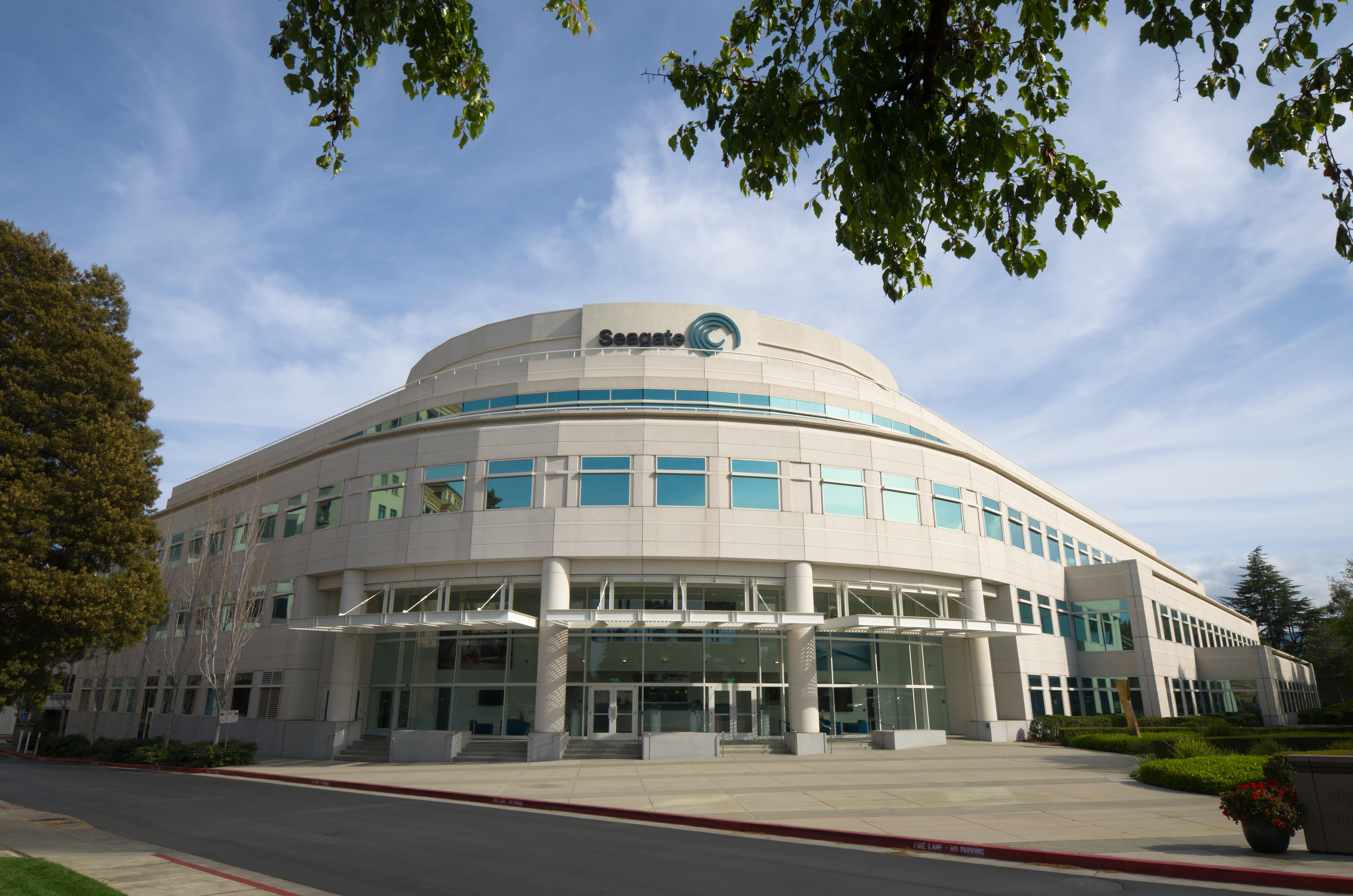
Former Seagate Technology headquarters during the 2010s in Cupertino, California

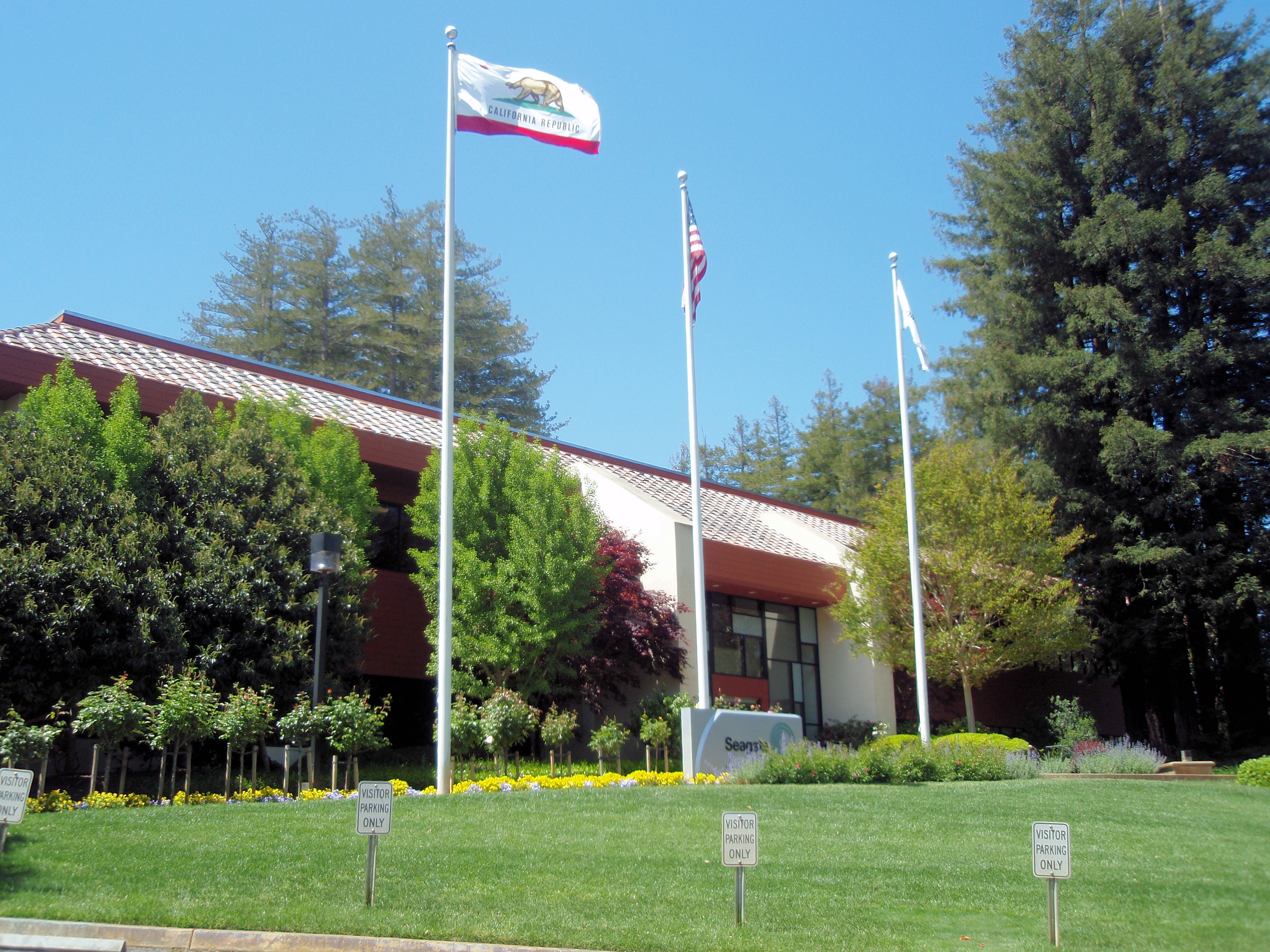
Former Seagate Technology headquarters prior to 2010 in Scotts Valley, California

Seagate was initially traded as a public company on the Nasdaq stock exchange under the ticker symbol SGAT. In 1994, it moved to the New York Stock Exchange as SEG. In 2000, Seagate incorporated in the Cayman Islands in order to reduce income taxes. In 2000, the company was taken private by an investment group composed of Seagate management, Silver Lake Partners, Texas Pacific Group, and others in a three-way merger-spinoff with Veritas Software; Veritas merged with Seagate, which was bought by the investment group. Veritas was then immediately spun off to shareholders, gaining rights to Seagate Software Network and Storage Management Group (with products such as Backup Exec), as well as Seagate's shares in SanDisk and Dragon Systems. Seagate Software Information Management Group was renamed Crystal Decisions in May 2001. In December 2002, Seagate re-entered the public market on the Nasdaq as STX.

By November 2023, 89% of the stock was controlled by institutional investors, with a controlling stake of 52% held by 8 investors. The largest stakes held by hedge funds Vanguard Group, Inc, Sanders Capital, LLC and BlackRock, Inc. account for 11%, 7.2%, 7.2% of shares outstanding respectively.

== Partnerships and acquisitions ==
Finis Conner left Seagate in early 1985 and founded Conner Peripherals, which originally specialized in small-form-factor drives for portable computers. Conner Peripherals also entered the tape drive business with its purchase of Archive Corporation. After ten years as an independent company, Conner Peripherals was acquired by Seagate in a 1996 merger.

In 2005, Seagate acquired Mirra Inc., a producer of personal servers for data recovery. It also acquired ActionFront Data Recovery Labs, which provides data recovery services.

In 2006, Seagate acquired Maxtor in an all-stock deal worth $1.9 billion, and afterwards continued to market the separate Maxtor brand. The following year, Seagate acquired EVault and MetaLINCS, later rebranded as i365.

In 2014, Seagate acquired Xyratex, a storage systems company, for approximately $375 million. The same year, it acquired LSI's flash enterprise PCIe flash and SSD controller products, and its engineering capabilities, from Avago for $450 million.

In October 2015, Seagate acquired Dot Hill Systems, a supplier of software and hardware storage systems, for approximately $696 million.

== Controversies ==
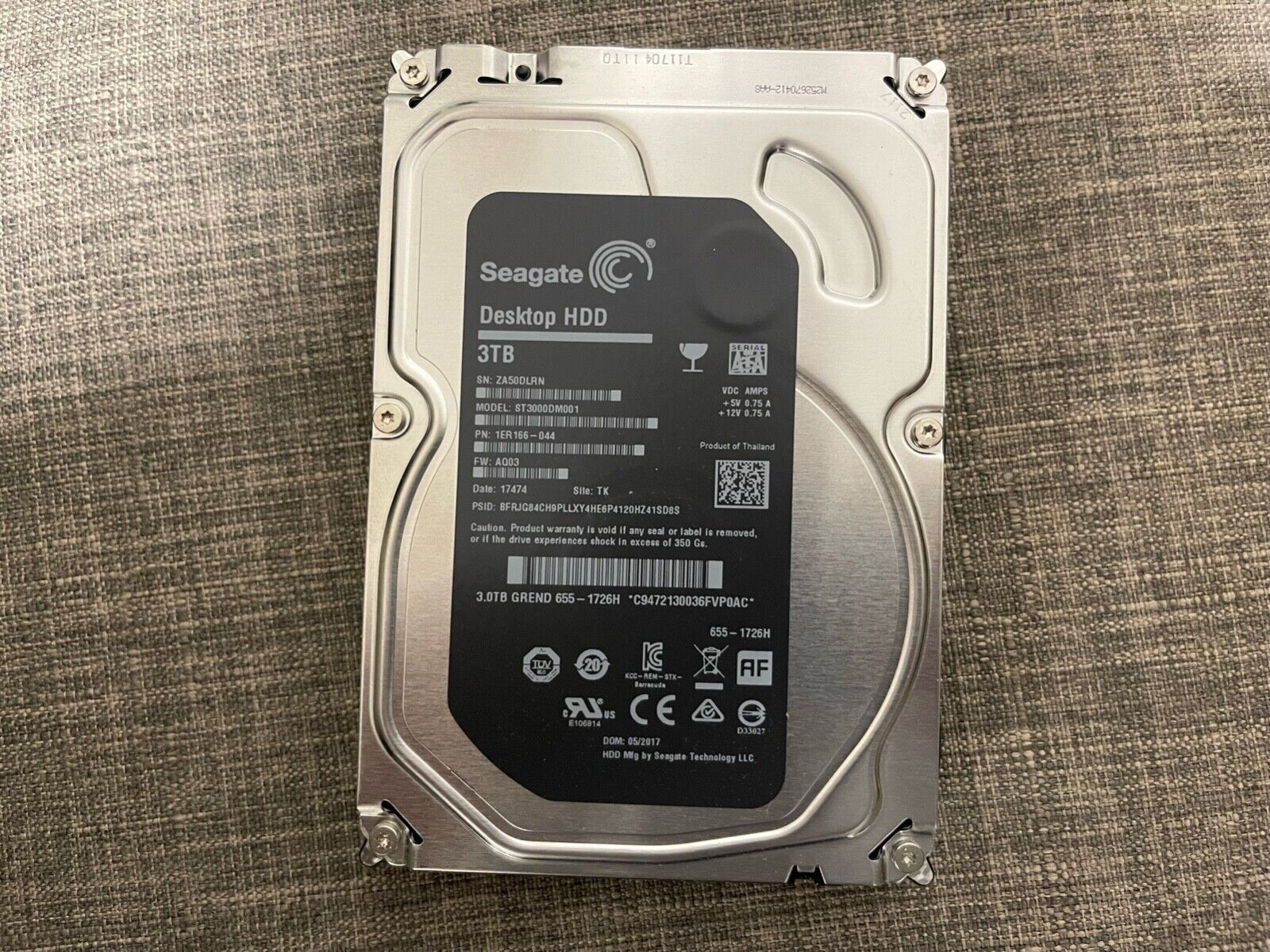
ST3000DM001 HDD, Seagate's most unreliable hard drive ever (as of 2024)

In 2015, Seagate's wireless NAS drives—a type of network storage device—were found to have an undocumented hardcoded password.

On January 21, 2014, numerous tech articles around the globe published findings from the cloud storage provider Backblaze that Seagate hard disks are least reliable among prominent hard disk manufacturers. However, the Backblaze tests have been criticized for having a flawed methodology that has inconsistent environment variables, such as ambient temperatures, vibration, and disk usage. In addition, Backblaze's statistics show that the vast majority of their installed drives are manufactured by Seagate, and Backblaze editor Andy Klein has noted "that a large number of new Seagate drives being deployed could be statistically responsible" for failure rate data in their specific datacenter population. In the broader landscape, Seagate enterprise drives were named "most reliable" for seven years running in the IT Brand Pulse survey of top IT professionals, and cited as the leader for the previous two years in every measured category: reliability, performance, innovation, price, and service and support. In 2019, Backblaze released updated statistics which reported that Seagate drives had the most failures in Q2 2019, whereas its best-rated drives were made by Toshiba.

In October 2021, a report by U.S. Senate Republicans claimed that Seagate violated Export Administration Regulations by selling parts and components to Huawei following U.S. sanctions against the Chinese telecommunications company. The company received another letter in August 2022 from the U.S. Commerce Department's Bureau of Industry and Security (BIS) for allegedly violating export sanctions to sell Huawei hard drives. Seagate denied any violations claiming that its foreign-made hard drives are not subject to the restriction since the disks and the equipment to make them were not a direct product of any American semiconductor technology or software. In April 2023, Seagate reached a settlement agreement with the Department agreeing to pay $300 million—the largest civil penalty imposed by the BIS—for selling over 7.4 million hard drives to Huawei without BIS authorization. The resolution also included three stages of audits focusing on its export controls compliance program and a suspended denial order.

In November 2026, the United States District Court for the Northern District of California granted final approval to a $175 million settlement in a securities class-action lawsuit against Seagate Technology Holdings plc and two of its executives, chief executive officer Dave Mosley and chief financial officer Gianluca Romano. The lawsuit alleged that Seagate had misled investors by concealing information about its sales of hard disk drives to Huawei Technologies between September 14, 2020, and April 19, 2023, amid U.S. export restrictions on the company. The settlement resolved the litigation without an admission of wrongdoing by Seagate. The court also awarded plaintiffs' counsel $43.5 million in attorneys' fees and more than $928,000 in litigation expenses.
