= Memorex =

Brand for Consumer Electronics

Memorex Corp.
- Memorex logo used between 1993 and 2008
- Type: Public
- Industry: Computer peripherals, computer media, consumer tape
- Founded: 1961
- Founder: Laurence L. Spitters, Arnold T. Challman, Donald F. Eldridge, W. Lawrence Noon
- Defunct: November 1996
- Fate: Brand currently owned by Digital Products International

Memorex Corp. was a company that began as a computer tape producer and expanded to become both a consumer media supplier and a major IBM plug compatible peripheral supplier. It was broken up and ceased to exist after 1996 other than as a consumer electronics brand specializing in disk recordable media for CD and DVD drives, flash memory, computer accessories and other electronics.

== History and evolution ==
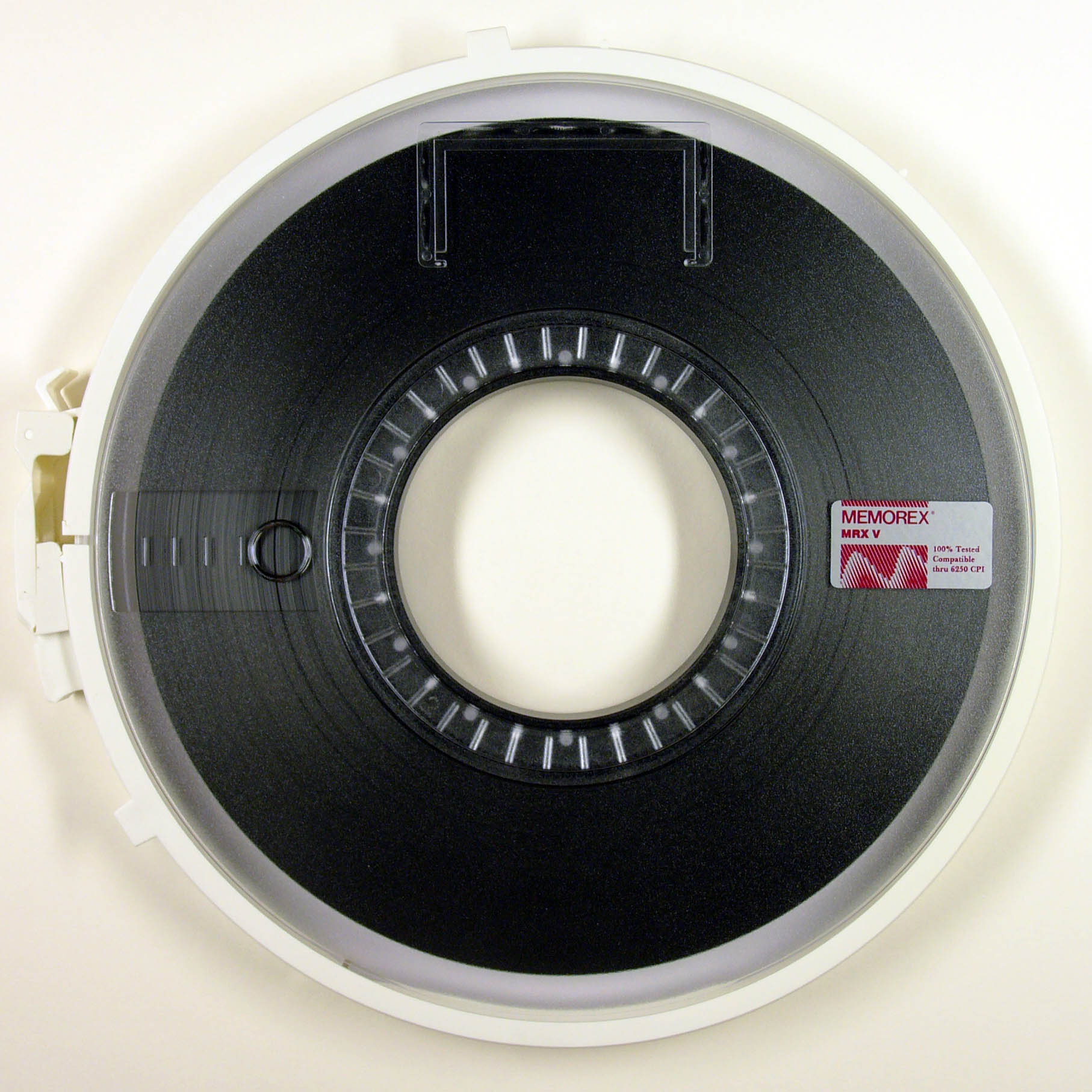
MRX V Memorex magnetic tape for mainframe computers

Established in 1961 in Silicon Valley, Memorex started by selling computer tapes, and then other media such as disk packs. The company later expanded into disk drives and other peripheral equipment for IBM mainframes. During the 1970s and into the early 1980s, Memorex was worldwide one of the largest independent suppliers of disk drives and communications controllers to users of IBM-compatible mainframes, as well as media for computer uses and consumers. The company's name is a portmanteau of "memory excellence".

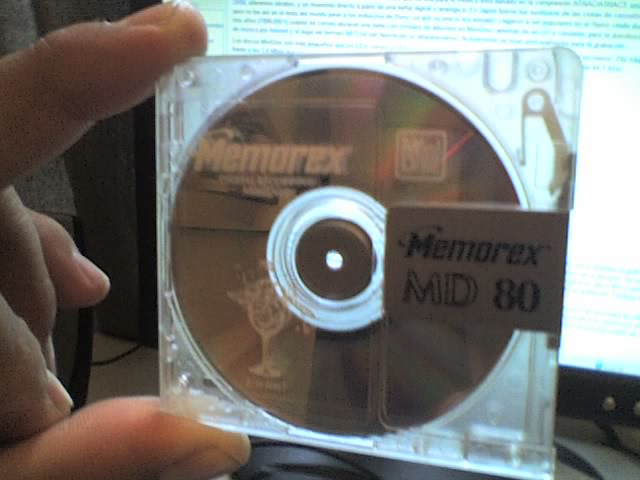
Memorex brand MiniDisc

Memorex entered the consumer media business in 1971 and started the ad campaign, first with its "shattering glass" advertisements and then with a series of legendary television commercials featuring jazz singer Ella Fitzgerald. In the commercials, she would sing a note that shattered a glass while being recorded to a Memorex audio cassette. The tape was played back and the recording also broke the glass, asking "Is it live, or is it Memorex?" This would become the company slogan which was used in a series of advertisements released through 1970s and 1980s.

Tandy acquired Memorex's consumer brand in 1982, subsequently expanding the product line so that by 1989 it included more than 120 items across seven product categories. The Memorex brand subsequently passed through several corporate owners and, as of 2026, is owned by Finest Brands, Inc. Memorex consumer products are presently marketed by Mizari Enterprises, Inc.

In 1982, Memorex was bought by Burroughs for its enterprise businesses. The company's consumer business, was sold to Tandy. Over the next six years, Burroughs and its successor Unisys shut down, sold off or spun out the various remaining parts of Memorex.

The computer media, communications and IBM end user sales and service organization were spun out as Memorex International. In 1988, Memorex International acquired the Telex Corporation becoming Memorex Telex NV, a corporation based in the Netherlands, which survived as an entity until the middle 1990s. The company evolved into a provider of information technology solutions including the distribution and integration of data network and storage products and the provision of related services in 18 countries worldwide. As late as 2006, several pieces existed as subsidiaries of other companies, see e.g., Memorex Telex Japan Ltd a subsidiary of Kanematsu or Memorex Telex (UK) Ltd. a subsidiary of EDS Global Field Services.

== Timeline ==
- 1961 – Memorex is founded by Laurence L. Spitters, Arnold T. Challman, Donald F. Eldridge and W Lawrence Noon with Spitters as president.
- 1962 – Memorex is one of the early independent companies to ship computer tape.
- May 1965 – Memorex IPO's at $25 and closes at $32.
- 1966 – Memorex is first independent company to ship a disk pack.
- Jun 1968 – Memorex is first to ship an IBM-plug-compatible disk drive
- 1970 – Memorex ships 1270 Communications Controller, an IBM 27xx/37xx compatible terminal controller
- 1971 – With CBS, Memorex forms CMX Systems, a company formed to design videotape editing systems
- Sep 1971 – Memorex launches its consumer tape business
- 1972 – Memorex launches its "Is it live, or is it Memorex?" campaign
- Apr 1981 – Burroughs acquires Memorex
- Apr 1982 – Burroughs sells Memorex consumer brand to Tandy
- May 1985 – Burroughs exits OEM disk drive business, selling sales and service to Toshiba
- Sep 1986 – Burroughs acquires Sperry
- Dec 1986 – Unisys spins off Memorex Media, Telecommunications and International businesses as Memorex International NV.
- Jan 1988 – Memorex-Telex merger
- Dec 1988 – Unisys mainly shuts down large disk business and spins off service and repair as Sequel.
- Nov 1993 – Tandy sells Memorex consumer brand to Hanny Holdings of Hong Kong
- Oct 1996 – The U.S. operations of Memorex Telex NV filed for bankruptcy and with court approval were sold November 1, 1996.
- Jan 2006 – Imation acquires Memorex brand for $330 million.
- Jan 2016 – Imation closed on the sale of its Memorex trademark and two associated trademark licenses to DPI Inc., a St. Louis-based branded consumer electronics company for $9.4 million.
- Jan 2024 – Finest Brands, Inc. a Los Angeles-based brand management firm, announces its acquisition of the Memorex brand, its associated global trademark and IP portfolio and its licensees. The terms of the deal were not disclosed.
