= LaCie =

American-French computer hardware company

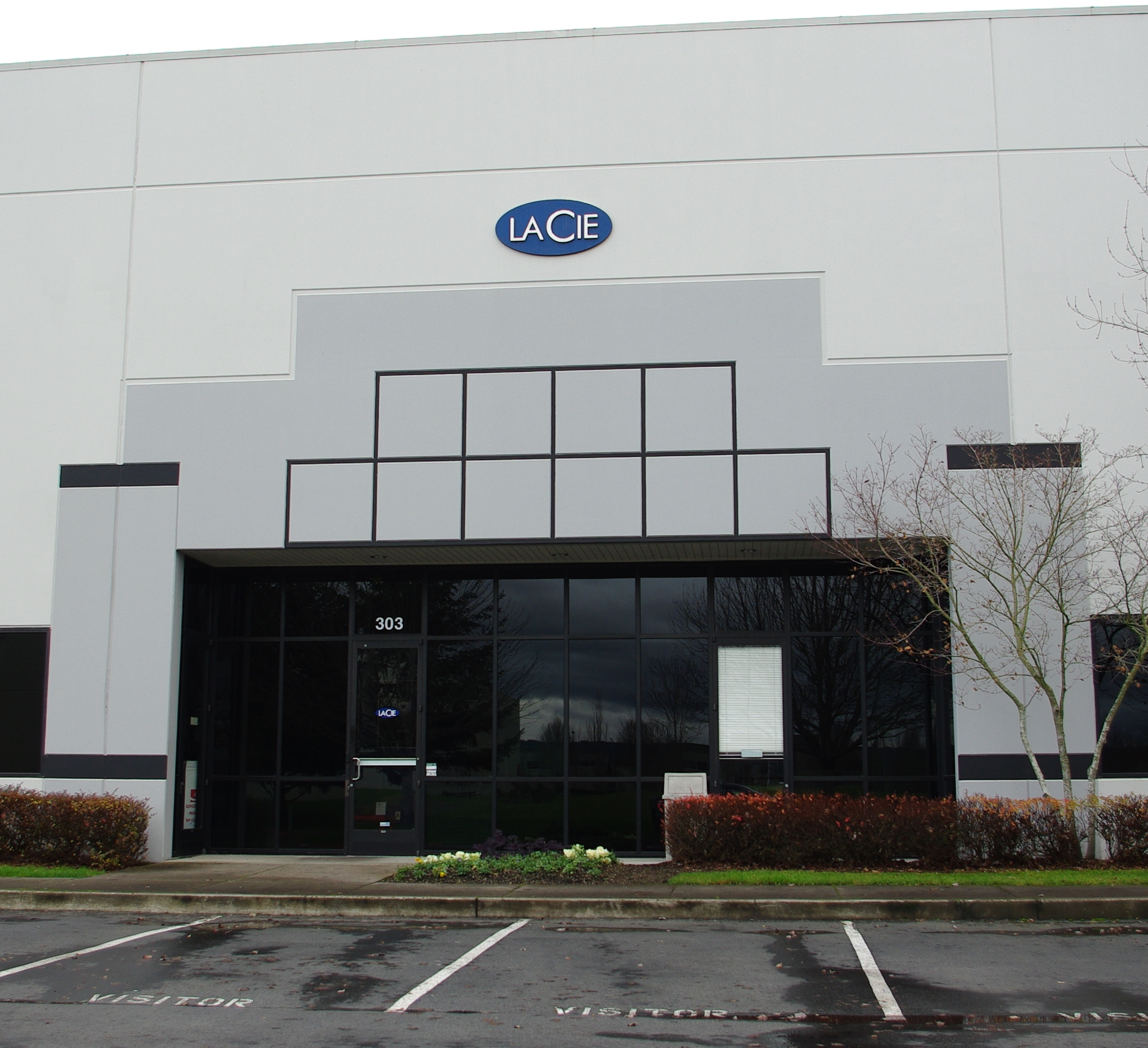
- LaCie's American headquarters in Hillsboro, Oregon
- Type: Subsidiary
- Industry: Computer hardware
- Founded: Oregon, 1987; 39 years ago Paris, 1989; 37 years ago
- Headquarters: Paris, France
- Products: Data storage, computer displays
- Revenue: €351.8 million
- Number of employees: 450
- Parent: Seagate Technology (2014–present)
- Website: www.lacie.com

LaCie (/lɑːˈsiː/; English: "The Company") is an American-French computer hardware company specializing in external hard drives, RAID arrays, Optical drives, Flash drives, and Computer monitors. The company markets several lines of hard drives with a capacity of up to many terabytes of data, with a choice of interfaces (FireWire 400, FireWire 800, eSATA, USB 2.0, USB 3.0, Thunderbolt, and Ethernet). LaCie also has a series of mobile bus-powered hard drives.

LaCie's computer display product line is targeted specifically to graphics professionals, with an emphasis on color matching.

== Company history ==
LaCie began life as two separate computer storage companies: in 1989 as électronique d2 in Paris, France, and in 1987 as LaCie in Tigard, Oregon (later Portland, Oregon), U.S.

In 1995, électronique d2 acquired La Cie, and later adopted the name 'LaCie' for all of its operations. At the early founding stages of both companies, both focused their businesses on IT storage solutions, based on the SCSI interface standard for connecting external devices to computers. SCSI was adopted by Apple Computer as its main peripheral interface standard and the market for both LaCie and d2 became closely, but not exclusively, associated with the Macintosh platform.

In Europe, the French company électronique d2 was founded in 1989 by Pierre Fournier and Philippe Spruch, working from their apartment in the 14th arrondissement of Paris. d2's main activity was assembling hard drives in external SCSI casings and selling them as peripheral devices.

By 1990, the company had outgrown its small beginnings and moved to new 900 square meter premises in rue Watt, also in Paris. By this stage, designing casings was no longer sufficient for d2 to maintain a competitive edge, and so the company began to develop its own products and invest in R&D. d2 began to open subsidiaries around Europe, the first in London in 1991, followed by offices in Brussels and Copenhagen. The company began to expand its business beyond the Mac market and target PC users. In 1995, électronique d2 acquired the US company La Cie, a subsidiary of Quantum. LaCie was operating in the same market niche as électronique d2, and the buyout gave d2 a foothold into the North American market. In 1998, it was decided to adopt the name LaCie as a worldwide brand, dropping the d2 name from its product range (although even today, several products still retain reference to it).

In the United States, La Cie, Ltd. (La Cie) was founded in July 1987 in Tigard, Oregon, U.S. Joel Kamerman, his parents Robert and Tudy Kamerman, and Roger Bates founded La Cie. Joel Kamerman was La Cie's president and general manager from July 1987 through January 1997.

In the US, La Cie was acquired by Plus Development, a subsidiary of the storage manufacturer Quantum in December 1990. As a subsidiary of Quantum, La Cie was licensed as the exclusive manufacturer of Apple-branded external SCSI hard drives, using Quantum hard disks. Joel Kamerman and Scott Phillips negotiated the deal between Apple Computer and La Cie. After the 1995 acquisition of La Cie by électronique d2, company management was headed by Philippe Spruch, who continues to head the combined company as of December 2013.

LaCie was purchased by Seagate Technology in March 2012 for $186 million. In August 2013, the US headquarters were moved back to Tigard.

== Timeline ==
- 1987 Joel Kamerman, Robert Kamerman, Tudy Kamerman, and Roger Bates found La Cie, Ltd. in Tigard, Oregon, U.S. It introduces the Cirrus Drive, the first external drive to win an industrial design award.
- 1989 Pierre Fournier (32) and Philippe Spruch (26) found électronique d2 in Paris.
- 1990 Plus Development, a Quantum Corp. subsidiary, acquires La Cie, Ltd.
- 1990 d2 expands and moves to new premises in rue Watt, Paris.
- 1991 Establishment of the first subsidiary in London (UK); development of the first d2 SCSI card for PC environment.
- 1992 Belgian offices open in Brussels and Danish offices in Copenhagen; Philippe Starck and Neil Poulton design new drive models.
- 1993 German subsidiary established in Düsseldorf; d2 moves its HQ to larger premises in Massy (southern suburbs of Paris).
- 1994 Subsidiaries opened in Rotterdam and Basel.
- 1995 Subsidiaries opened in Madrid and Milan; électronique d2 buys LaCie, a subsidiary of Quantum; d2 gains a foothold in the North American market.
- 1996 Offices open in Stockholm and the Canadian subsidiary of LaCie is opened in Toronto. électronique d2 is listed at the nouveau marché in Paris.
- 1997 Transfer of LaCie US to new premises in Portland; électronique d2 acquires NATI, a repair and maintenance company; LaCie launches range of high-end 21" monitors and colour management devices.
- 1998 LaCie acquires ASP Technologies, Inc., an American maker of Macintosh clones. The name "LaCie" replaces " électronique d2" as the worldwide brand name of the group.
- 1999 LaCie disposes of NATI.
- 2000 Establishment of the Australian subsidiary; launch of the PocketDrive, a 2.5" peripheral disk drive.
- 2001 Creation of the Japanese subsidiary; launch of the 18-inch flat panel monitor and DVD players.
- 2002 Launch of the Fusion CD-RW.
- 2003 Launch of 500 GB external Hard Drive: LaCie Big Disk; portable drives designed by F.A. Porsche line of storage solutions; first Triple Interface Hard Drives.
- 2004 1 TB external Hard Drive the LaCie Bigger Disk.
- 2009 LaCie acquires Caleido, a peer-to-peer storage start-up, with their product named Wuala.
- 2012 Seagate announced plans to purchase LaCie for USD$186 million
- 2014 Seagate acquired Lacie.

== Products ==
LaCie's original business was external SCSI hard drives, but its range has expanded over the years to include early CD writers, some of the first DVD drives, magneto-optical drives, SyQuest drives, tape backup, RAID arrays, and mobile USB and FireWire drives.

== Designers ==
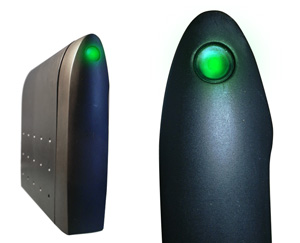
Le Coq hard drive designed by Neil Poulton.

Prior to the électronique d2 buyout in 1995, Ziba Design, in Portland Oregon, designed the majority of LaCie's products, including the award-winning Joule tower, the Cirrus and the Tsunami drive. By 1995 LaCie had won awards for industrial design for every external storage product they introduced.

In Paris, France, électronique d2 began to make a name for itself as early as 1991 by hiring industrial designers like Philippe Starck and Neil Poulton. The emphasis was on ergonomics, distinctive moulding and some radically different designs.

The French designer Philippe Starck designed three products for the company: "K1", "Apollo" and "Tokyo". These three "toaster" drives were manufactured in gravity-cast, hand polished aluminium and gained their nickname because of a passing resemblance to 1950s chrome toasters. Neil Poulton and Christophe Pillet, then Starck employees and both future LaCie designers, ran the projects. A fourth Starck-designed product was completed to model stage in 1992 but was never manufactured.

Neil Poulton has the longest running history with électronique d2/LaCie. From 1991 onwards, Scottish-born Poulton designed numerous products for d2, including the "Shark' and "FM Tuner' and the award-winning, phallic "le Coq" hard drive. Poulton also designed d2's graphics, literature, packaging, trade fair booths, and the two électronique d2 logos. When d2 bought out LaCie in 1995, Poulton was brought in to design the current LaCie logo and the company's corporate identity.

Poulton is responsible for the design of the best-selling "d2" range, the "Pocketdrive" range, the "Rugged" drive, the "Little Big Disk' and numerous professional and "unsigned" d2/LaCie products dating back to 1991. His funnel-inspired "Firewire Speakers" won the French "Janus de l'Industrie' award in 2007.

Christophe Pillet, better known for his high-end furniture, designed products for d2 /LaCie from 1994-96 after quitting Philippe Starck's office.

In 2003, Philippe Spruch commissioned an agency to identify the world's "best known" design studio. He then hired the world-famous Porsche Design company to design a product range which would become best-sellers for LaCie between 2003 and 2006.

A spate of colorful products released in 2006 included Karim Rashid's "shocking" dayglo products and the popular Brick drive designed by Frenchman Ora-Ito. Never far from controversy, Ito's award-winning USB Hub of 2007 had to be renamed to avoid infringement with the original name.

In 2007, the French national museum, Centre Georges Pompidou, in Paris acquired LaCie products for its permanent collection including Poulton's "le Coq", "d2"," LBD", "Firewire Speakers", "Pocketdrive" and "Rugged", Ito's "Brick" and "USB Hub", and two Porsche Design drives.

== Innovations ==
LaCie was one of the first companies to include switchable, built-in termination with their Cirrus, Tsunami, and ZFP SCSI drives for Macintosh computers.

== Competitors ==
- Archos
- ioSafe
- Iomega
- LG
- Western Digital
- Fabrik Inc.
- Synology Inc.
