= Neil Poulton =

Scottish product designer (born 1963)

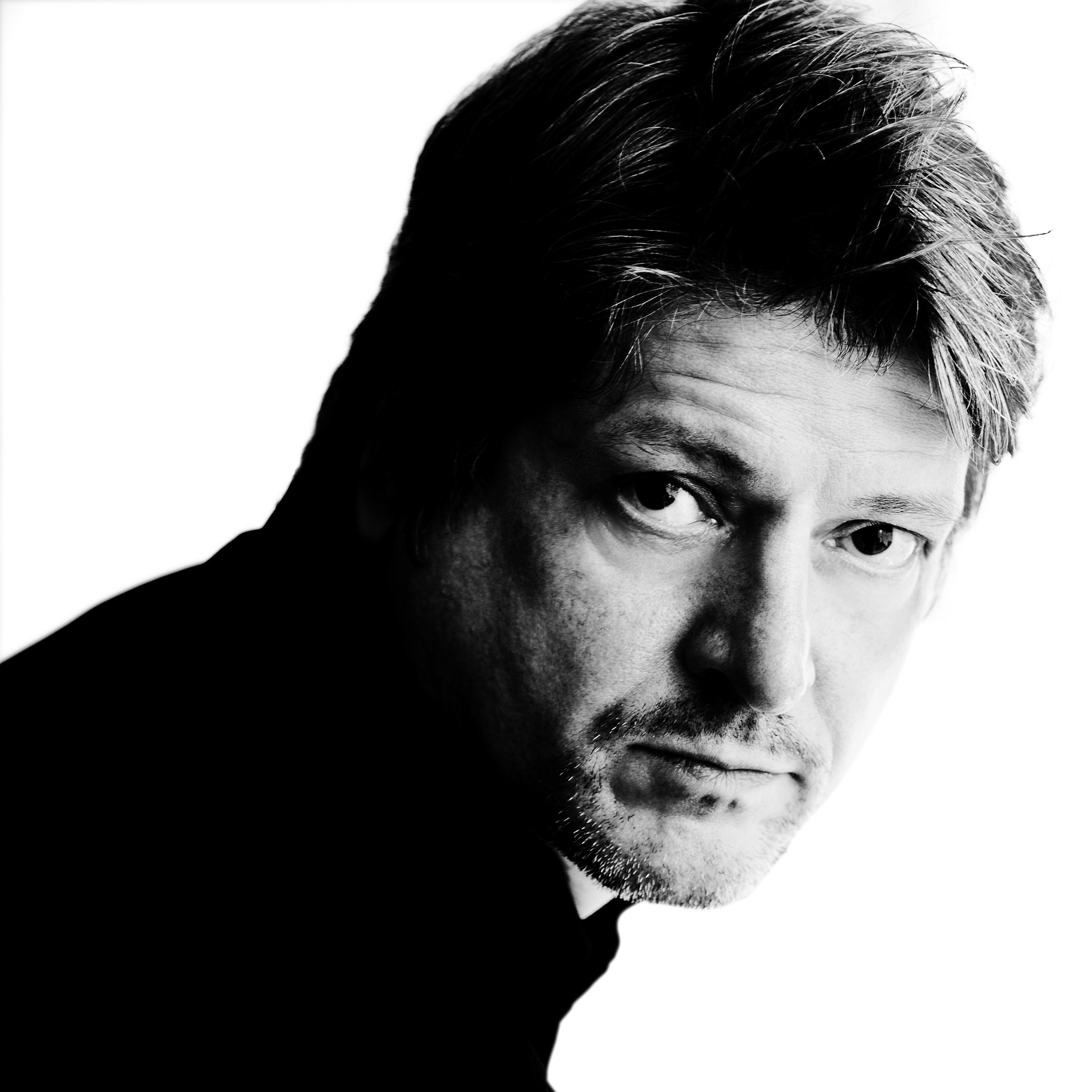
Portrait of Neil Poulton

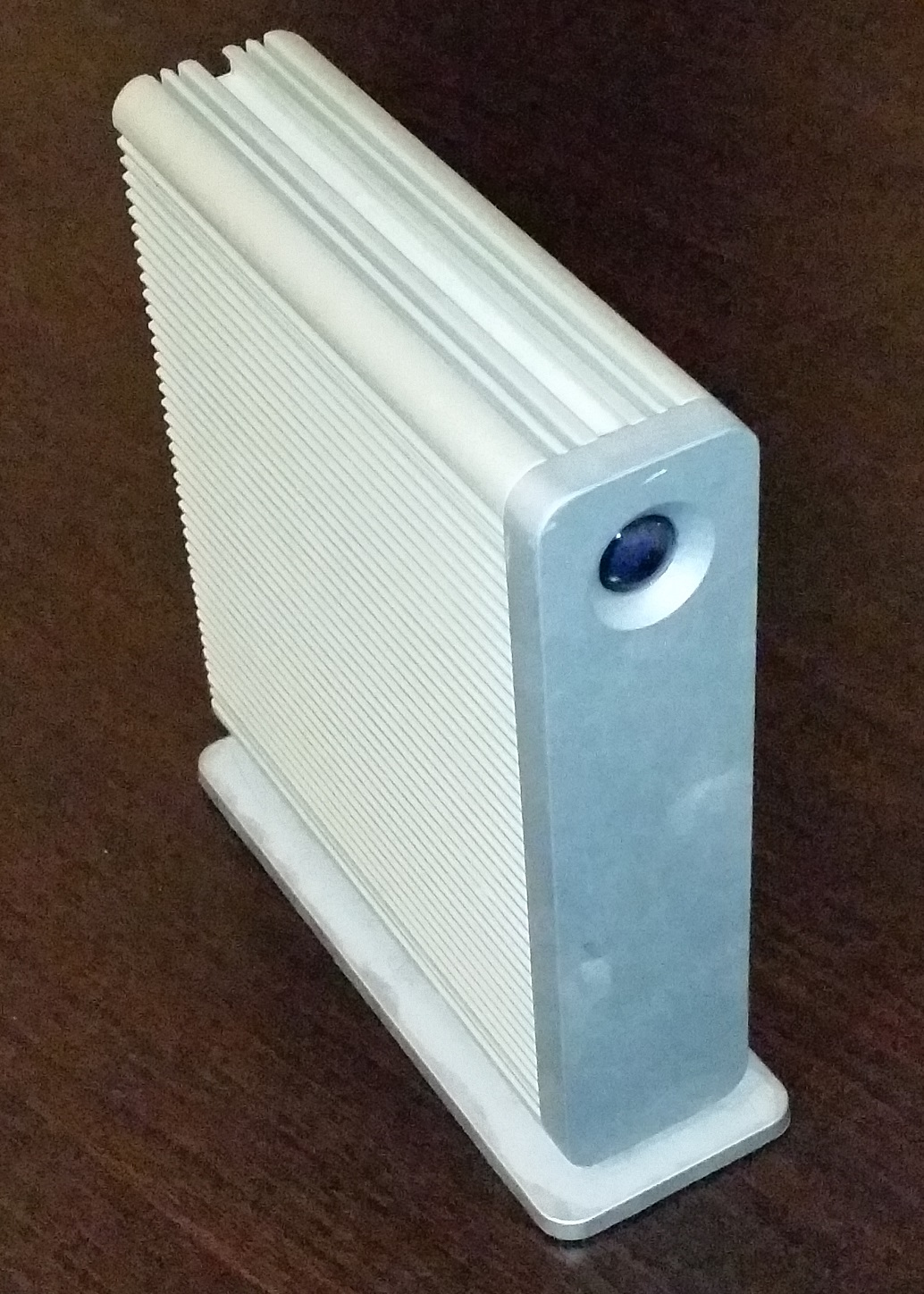
1TB LaCie external hard drive

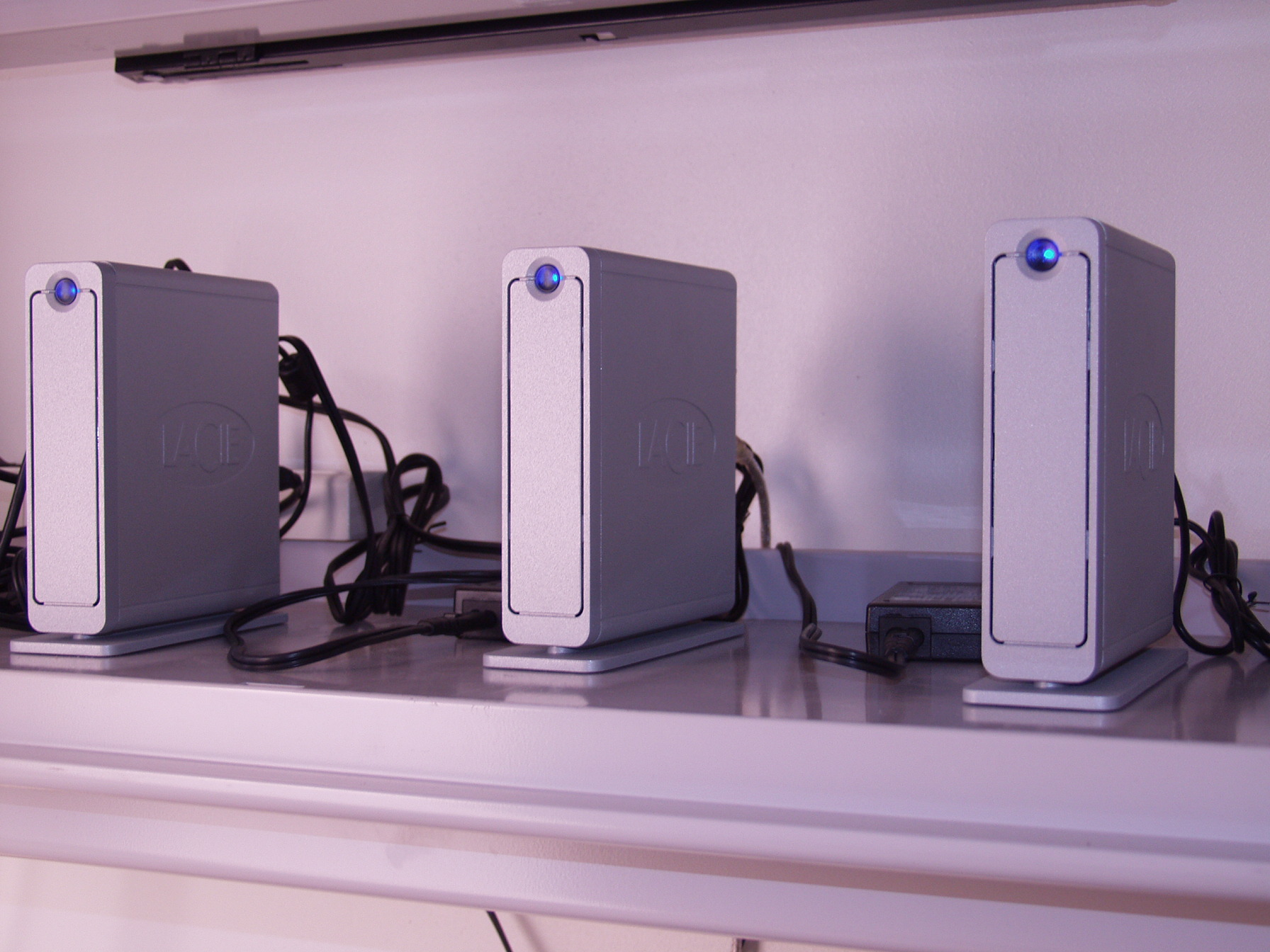
LaCie external hard drives

Neil Poulton (born 1963) is a Scottish product designer, based in Paris, France. He specialises in the design of 'deceptively simple-looking mass-produced objects' and has won numerous international design awards. Poulton is best known for his designs in the fields of technology and lighting design and is often associated with manufacturers LaCie and Artemide.

Time magazine has included Poulton in 'The Design 100 – The people and ideas behind today's most influential design'.

The Centre Georges Pompidou museum in Paris includes six Poulton-designed objects including the Rugged Hard Drive in its Permanent Contemporary Collection. Poulton's first major solo exhibition 'design by neil poulton' was held in the Glyptotheque (Zagreb) museum in 2013. His Scopas lamp for Artemide was inaugurated into the first Permanent Scottish Gallery of V&A Dundee, Scotland, in 2018.

In 2019 Neil Poulton was named one of le FD100 – the 100 designers who are sharing French Design all over the world.

Neil Poulton has lived and worked in Paris since 1991.

== Early career ==
Poulton gained a BSc degree in Industrial Design (technology) at Napier University in Edinburgh in 1985 and was awarded the SIAD Chartered Society of Designers Student Product Designer of the Year. In 1988, he gained a master's degree in design at the Domus Academy in Milan, Italy, under Italian architect Andrea Branzi and designer Alberto Meda. Poulton's tutors included Italian architect Ettore Sottsass, German industrial designer Richard Sapper, Isao Hosoe and Anna Castelli Ferrieri.

Neil Poulton first came to public view in 1989 as the creator of the 'Ageing Pens'. Also known as the 'Penna Mutante' (The Mutant Pen), these pens were made from a living, wearing plastic, which 'ages as layers of colour wear away through use'. The Ageing Pens were exhibited in London's Victoria and Albert Museum, Centre Georges Pompidou in Paris and The Axis Gallery in Tokyo.

Poulton worked briefly for French designer Philippe Starck in Paris from 1991 through 1992.

== Academia ==
Poulton has been a guest speaker and visiting professor at schools including Central Saint Martins College of Art and Design in London, the Domus Academy in Milan and the University of Western Australia in Perth, Australia. He is an active, if occasional, jury member of the École nationale supérieure de création industrielle (Les Ateliers) in Paris and has judged design degrees at the École de design Nantes Atlantique.

In 2019 Poulton was inducted into the Edinburgh Napier University Alumni Hall Of Fame.

== Exhibitions ==
In November 2013, the Croatian Academy of Sciences and Arts presented "design by neil poulton", the first major solo exhibition of designer Neil Poulton, in Zagreb, Croatia. Held in the main 360-metre square gallery of the ground floor of the Glyptotheque (Zagreb) museum, the exhibition was sponsored by the Croatian Ministry of Culture, the City of Zagreb and the Institut français.

'In this exhibition, the design process is represented in all its stages from sketches, models and prototypes, through production components to final products, documenting the author's integrated approach to design.'

== Awards ==
Poulton's designs have won numerous awards, including seven French "Etoile de l'Observeur du Design" prizes, fourteen German Red Dot Design Awards, seven German "IF" International Forum Design prizes, three French "Janus de l'industrie" awards, two "Recommendation Premio Compasso d'Oro" and the "Best of The Best" Red Dot Design Awards in 1994 and 2007. Poulton has also been a judge of international design competitions including the 'IF' International Forum Design Award and the Hong Kong Design Award (HKDA) in 2018.

- 2026 Red Dot Design Award Winner, Germany: "Ray Charger" for Lexon.
- 2026 Le French Design FD100 4th edition Winner, France: "Ray Light" for Lexon
- 2025 Red Dot Design Award Winner, Germany: "Ray Light" for Lexon.
- 2025 'IF' International Forum Design, Germany, Award Winner : "Ray Light" for Lexon.
- 2024 Shortlisted for Dezeen Designer Of The Year 2024.
- 2024 Red Dot Design Award Winner, Germany : "Ray Speaker" for Lexon.
- 2024 'IF' International Forum Design, Germany, Award Winner : "Ray Speaker" for Lexon.
- 2023 Good Design Award (Chicago Athenaeum) USA : 'Mobile Drive' hard drive, designed for LaCie.
- 2023 Selection ADI design index 'Rosebud' outdoor lighting system, designed for Castaldi Lighting
- 2022 Good Design Award (Chicago Athenaeum) USA : 'Rosebud' outdoor lighting system, designed for Castaldi Lighting
- 2017 European Product Design Award, Gold Winner, USA : 'Chromé', hard drive, designed for LaCie.
- 2017 European Product Design Award, Silver Winner, USA : 'Scopas', pendant light designed for Artemide.
- 2016 International Design Award Silver Winner, USA : 'Scopas', pendant light designed for Artemide.
- 2016 Red Dot Design Award Winner, Germany : 'Chromé', hard drive, designed for LaCie.
- 2016 Label de l'observeur du design 2016, France : 'Mobi-One' terminal, designed for Mobi-Rider.
- 2016 Label de l'observeur du design 2016, France : 'd2 Thunderbolt2' hard drive, designed for LaCie.
- 2014 Red Dot Design Award Winner, Germany : 'Rea', wall lamp, designed for Artemide.
- 2013 Red Dot Design Award Winner, Germany : 'Scopas', designed for Artemide.
- 2011 "Menzione d'Onore Premio Compasso d'Oro ADI" : 'Veio' Table Lamp, designed for Artemide.
- 2010 Red Dot Design Award Winner, Germany : 'Sound2 Speakers', designed for LaCie.
- 2009 'G -Mark' Award, Japan : '5big' RAID server.
- 2009 'IF' International Forum Design, Germany, Award Winner : '5big' RAID server.
- 2009 Red Dot Design Award Winner : '5big' RAID server.
- 2009 Red Dot Design Award Winner : 'Lacinema Rugged'.
- 2008 'Janus De l'Industrie' Award, France : 5big' RAID server.
- 2008 "Recommendation Premio Compasso d'Oro" : 'Talak' Table Lamp, designed for Artemide.
- 2008 Time Magazine "Design 100" Selection : 'Firewire Speakers'.
- 2008 Red Dot Design Award Winner : 'Hard Disk Designed By Neil Poulton'.
- 2008 Red Dot Design Award Winner : '2 Big hard drive'.
- 2008 'IF' International Forum Design Award Winner : '2 Big' hard drive.
- 2008 Étoile de l'Observeur du Design Award :'Nessie' lighting system in Ductal concrete, designed for Atelier Sedap.
- 2008 'Etoile De L'observeur Du Design' Award :'Firewire Speakers'.
- 2007 'Janus De l'Industrie' Award, France : 'Firewire Speakers'.
- 2007 Etoile De L'observeur Du Design' Award : 'Little Big Disk'.
- 2007 'IF' International Forum Design Award Winner : 'Little Big Disk'.
- 2007 'Etoile De L'observeur Du Design' : 'Rugged' hard drive.
- 2006 Red Dot Design Award Winner : 'Rugged' hard drive.
- 2006 Red Dot Design Award 'Best of the Best' Award Winner : 'Talak' table lamp, designed for Artemide.
- 2006 'Etoile De L'observeur Du Design' : 'Talak' table lamp.
- 2003 APCI 'Etoile De L'observeur Du Design' : 'D2' hard drive range.
- 2003 'Augusto Morello 3rd Edition/Intel Design Prize' : 'Talo' lighting system, designed for Artemide.
- 2002 APCI 'Etoile De L'observeur Du Design : 'Talo' lighting system.
- 2002 Red Dot Design Award Winner : 'Talo' lighting system.
- 2002 APCI 'Etoile De L'observeur Du Design : 'Talo' lighting system.
- 2002 Red Dot Design Award Winner, Design Zentrum, Germany : 'Talo' lighting system.
- 2002 'IF' International Forum Design Award Winner : 'Talo' lighting system.
- 2002 "Recommendation Premio Compasso d'Oro" : 'Talo' lighting system.
- 2000 'Design Plus Lighting + Building' Prize, Germany : 'Surf' lighting system, designed for Artemide.
- 1999 'Janus De l'Industrie' Paris, France : 'Surf' lighting system.
- 1999 'Red Dot Best of the Best' Winner : 'Surf' lighting system.
- 1999 'IF' International Forum Design Award Winner : 'Surf' lighting system.
- 1999 'Parcours Design' Prize, Batimat Trade Fair, Paris : 'Surf' lighting system.
- 1999 'Smau Industrial Design Award' :'TX8000 Raid Tower'.
- 1995 'Design Oscar', Paris, France : 'Click!' table lamps for Vianne/Domec.
- 1995 'Mat De Bronze', France : 'Eclipse' & 'Bolide' wall lamps for Atelier Sedap.
- 1994 Red Dot Design Award 'Best of the Best Product Design' Award Winner : 'Coq' disk drive for électronique d2.
- 1994 'BBC Design Awards' Nomination : 'Coq', disk drive.
- 1985 SIAD Chartered Society of Designers Product Designer of the Year (Student Medal), London, UK.
