= Fabrik =

Fabrik may refer to:

- Fabrik Inc., a manufacturer of external hard drives and associated software
- Fabrik (Hamburg), an events centre in Hamburg, Germany
- Fabrik (software), a visual programming integrated development environment
- FABRIK, an inverse kinematics solver
