= Mountain Computer =

Defunct American computer company

Mountain Computer, Inc.
- Industry: Computer
- Founded: 1977; 48 years ago in Santa Cruz, California
- Defunct: 1988; 37 years ago
- Fate: Acquired by Nakamichi
- Key people: James Sedin, CEO
- Products: Peripherals
- Number of employees: 320 (1986)

Mountain Computer, Inc. (also known as Mountain Hardware) was a privately held American computer peripheral manufacturer active as an independent company from 1977 to 1988. In its early years, the company chiefly developed products for the Apple II, including sound synthesizers, samplers, and hard disk and tape drives. Mountain also produced floppy disk duplicators for enterprise use. In the mid-1980s Mountain pivoted to focusing on products for the IBM Personal Computer and compatibles. In late 1988, the company was acquired by Nakamichi.

== History ==
Mountain Computer was founded in 1977 by a group of private investors based in Santa Cruz, California, with $5,000 in cash. James Sedin, an Olympic medalist turned businessman, was asked to manage the company as its chief executive officer (CEO); he served that role until well after Mountain's acquisition in 1988, later being named as the company's president and chairman of the board as well as CEO. Mountain Computer was originally based in the Harvey West industrial complex in Santa Cruz.

In 1980, the company introduced the Music System, an additive synthesis sound card for the Apple II that allowed users to compose music with a myriad of timbres and through multiple means, including by light pen. The Music System quickly became popular among students and professors of music departments at universities, and by 1981, it was the single most popular personal computer–based synthesizer. In 1982, the company partnered with Passport Designs to enhance the Music System with more complex composition software and a four-octave hardware keyboard.

The company introduced its first product for the IBM Personal Computer in 1982 with the Supertalker II, a sampler that allowed the IBM PC to acquire small soundbites through a microphone port on the board. The product was geared toward education—facilitating the teaching of phonics, spelling, and math, and acting as an instruction aid toward people with disabilities—and toward domestic use—as a makeshift security system and to facilitate the use of voice-controlled devices. Unlike most third-party vendors of IBM PC products, Mountain licensed IBM's patents for their ISA bus during the development of the Supertalker II. At least one IBM PC clone manufacturer resold the Supertalker II as a value-add for their systems.

Mountain began manufacturing data storage devices, such as floppy disk duplicators and hard disk and tape drives, in the early 1980s, becoming a major OEM of these products. The company's Model 3200, a 5.25-inch floppy duplicator, saw use by other large computer companies, such as Verbatim for their Data Encore division. In 1983, Mountain introduced a hard disk drive for the Apple II and Apple III that had a storage capacity of 20 MB. It was the first hard drive system cross-compatible with both families of Apple computers. Mountain sourced their hard drives from other companies, including Quantum and NEC. In August 1986, Mountain acquired Bering Industries, a Fremont, California–based manufacturer of hard drives. In October 1986, Quantum sued Mountain over alleged patent infringement and trademark infringement of the Hardcard, which Quantum developed under their Plus Development subsidiary. Mountain developed a clone of the Hardcard called the Drivecard, using drives manufactured by NEC; in advertising they used the terms "Hardcard" and "Hard Card" without permission by Quantum. Quantum and Mountain settled out of court in 1988.

Mountain employed 320 workers in 1986. By that year, peripherals for the IBM PC and compatibles represented the vast majority of Mountain's product roster. The company's share of Apple-compatible products meanwhile dwindled to just 2 percent, down from 95 percent in 1981. Mountain's generated $50 million in revenue in 1986, shrinking to $49 million in 1987 before rising again to $60 million in 1988. They were then the 13th largest peripheral manufacturer in Silicon Valley.

In late 1988, Mountain was acquired by the Japanese electronics manufacturer Nakamichi for $45 million in cash. Mountain remained in Santa Cruz as an independently managed subsidiary for several years.
