= FCIM =

FCIM may refer to:

- Football Club Internazionale Milano
- Fusible core injection molding
- Fellow of The Chartered Institute of Marketing
