= Plus Development =

Hard disk producing company in California, United States

Plus Development Corporation
- Type: Subsidiary
- Industry: Computer data storage
- Founded: 1983; 43 years ago
- Founder: Stephen Berkley; Dave Brown; Joel Harrison
- Defunct: 1993; 33 years ago
- Fate: Absorbed into Quantum Corporation
- Headquarters: Milpitas, California, United States
- Area served: Worldwide
- Products: Hard disk drives
- Parent: Quantum Corporation

Plus Development Corporation was a majority-owned subsidiary of Quantum Corporation. The company invented the Hardcard, a hard disk drive on an expansion card, which started a wave of companies producing similar products in the 1980s.

== History ==
Quantum Corporation specialized in making sophisticated and expensive hard drives for minicomputers. Plus Development was formed in October, 1983, by a handful of Quantum employees, led by Stephen Berkley (President), Dave Brown (Engineering), and Joel Harrison (Architecture), based on a conversation over dinner between Nolan Bushnell and Quantum President James Patterson that Quantum needed to start building products for the end user market. Their goal was to provide a simplified upgrade path for the newly released IBM Personal Computer which did not come with a hard drive. The company was originally incorporated as BBH Corporation (using the initials for Berkley, Brown, and Harrison), but also used the name Bits in Space for fun. It later changed its name to Qew Corporation (a pun on the first initial of Quantum), finally ending up as Plus Development Corporation.

== Product development ==
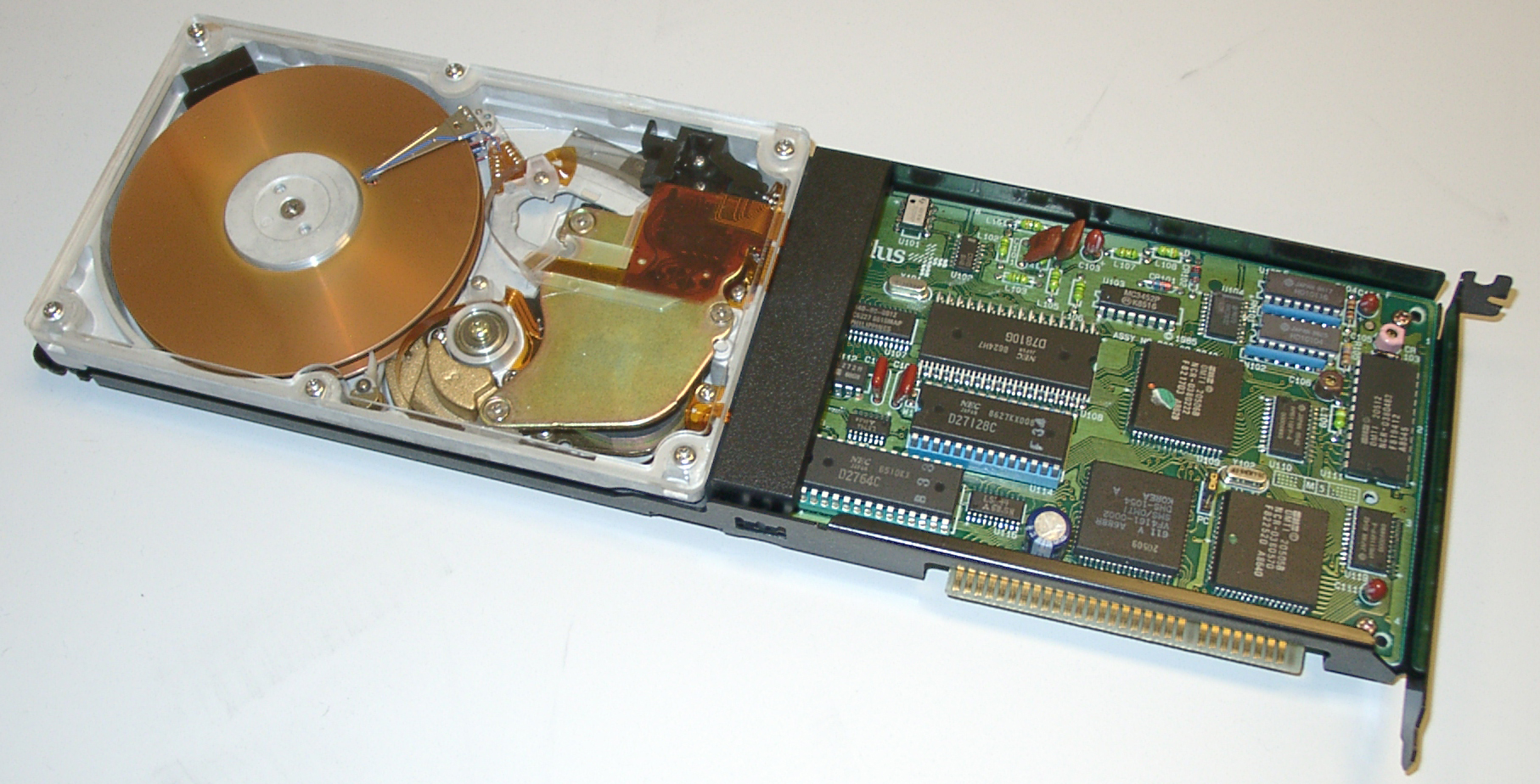
A Hardcard 20 hard disk on a card with an acrylic cover for display purposes. The Hardcard from Plus Development was the first hard drive on a plug in card for PCs.

Over the two years after Plus Development was launched, the team was working on some major industry firsts:

- A hard disk that installed in an ISA PC card expansion slot (not a PCMCIA slot not invented at that time)
- Host controller integrated with the hard disk printed circuit board (PCB)
- A drive controller chipset cheaper than any previously built
- Hard drive thickness of only 1 in
- Consumer-focused installation of a hard disk

== Competition ==
Within one year of the Plus Development introduction of Hardcard, 28 companies had released similar products. At that time, all of the other products were using a standard hard drive with a 1.6 inch/40.6 mm height forcing the card to hang over the adjacent PC slot. The hard drive was located on the opposite side away from the connector sometimes enabling a short half-length expansion card to be installed in the adjacent slot. These hard drive cards were usually described as occupying 1.5 expansion slots. Below are some of companies and product names with a similar product to the Plus Hardcard.

- JVC (Japan Victor Company)
- Kamerman Labs, (Beaverton, Oregon) – Slot Machine
- Maynard Electronics, (Casselberry, Florida) – On Board
- Microscience International Corp, (Mountain View, California) – EasyCard
- Mountain Computer Inc., (Scotts Valley, California) – DriveCard
- Qubie Distributing, (Camarillo, California) – Hardpack
- Tandon Corporation, (Chatsworth, California) – DiskCard, Business Card
- Verbatum Corporation, (Sunnyvale, California) – Data Bank
- Western Digital, (Irvine, California) – FileCard

== Tandy 1000 ==
Hard cards were the most desirable and easiest way to add a hard drive to the original Tandy 1000 lines that had 8-bit slots such as the Sx, Tx, Sl, Tl series. However Tandy offered a size reduced 10.5-in slot, where as Plus hard cards took a full length 13 inches.

Hence Plus development hardcards are not physically compatible, as they are too long to fit in a Tandy 1000 computer. If the cover is removed, and the metal plate is removed so that a Plus Development card could fit in physically, it would work normally.

== Acquisitions ==
Over the eight years of its existence, Plus Development had only a single acquisition, La Cie, of Tualatin, Oregon, a manufacturer and direct marketeer of external hard drives for Apple Computer products. The trade paper InfoWorld published the announcement in its December 3, 1990, edition noting the $3.8 million cash transaction.
