= STec =

sTec, Inc.
- Industry: Computer data storage
- Predecessor: Simple Technology
- Founded: March 1990; 36 years ago
- Defunct: June 2013
- Fate: Acquired by HGST, a Western Digital company
- Headquarters: San Jose, California, USA
- Number of locations: San Jose, Sunnyvale and Santa Ana, Calif., USA; China; Germany; India; Italy; Japan; Malaysia; Taiwan
- Parent: Western Digital
- Website: hgst.com

sTec, Inc., was an American computer data storage technology company headquartered in California. It had research and development, sales, support and manufacturing sites in China, India, Japan, Malaysia, Silicon Valley (USA), and Taiwan.

sTec, formerly Simple Technology then SimpleTech, was founded by Manouch Moshayedi and Mark Moshayedi in 1990. The company designs, develops and manufactures solid-state drives (SSDs) based on flash memory and dynamic random access memory (DRAM), providing them to data center environments and original equipment manufacturer (OEM) customers.

Customers include Dell, EMC, Fujitsu, HP, and IBM. sTec also has distributors, resellers and system integrators.

sTec was acquired by HGST, a Western Digital company. Western Digital completed the acquisition of sTec on September 12, 2013.

== History ==
=== Simple Technology ===
Logo of Simple Technology used from 1990 to 2001

In 1990, Simple Technology was founded by two brothers from Iran: Manouch Moshayedi and Mike Moshayedi. Using $100,000 of their own savings, the brothers created a company that designed and sold computer memory modules. Three years later, Mark Moshayedi (aged 38 at the time) joined the company as chief operating and technical officer. They are of Iranian (Persian) descent. Mark is related to them. From 1990 to 2007, the company designed and manufactured flash solid-state drives, dynamic random-access memory (DRAM), and static random-access memory (SRAM)..

In 1994, Simple Technology bought Cirrus Logic’s flash controller operation, to enter the flash memory business for consumer electronic devices. In 1998, Simple Technology bought SiliconTech Inc., obtaining that company's business flash memory customer base and operation. In 1999, sTec was first to market the 1 GB solid-state IDE storage devices, SDRAM modules and also 320 MB Type II CompactFlash.

Simple Technology became a publicly traded company on the NASDAQ stock exchange on September 26, 2000, under the ticker symbol of STEC.

=== SimpleTech ===
Logo of Simple Technology used from 2001 to 2007

The company shortened its name to SimpleTech in 2001.

The SimpleShare consumer network attached storage device was announced in November 2004. In 2006, SimpleTech announced its first portable external hard drive designed by Pininfarina.

In early 2007, the company sold the SimpleTech consumer division to Fabrik Inc. (a company funded and founded by Keyur Patel, Anaal Udaybabu along with Mike Cordano) for $43 million in cash.

Fabrik continued to develop and market products under the SimpleTech brand including the Joggle.com website and the environmentally friendly [re]drive introduced in 2008.

Fabrik was acquired by Hitachi in 2009 for an estimated $950 million.

=== sTec ===
Logo of STEC, Inc., from 2007 to 2013

Following the 2007 sale, the remaining OEM business then operated as STEC, Inc. (later stylized as sTec, Inc.), and was publicly traded on NASDAQ until being acquired in 2013. The company then focused on business-flash memory products. At that point Mike Moshayedi resigned from sTec, Mark Moshayedi became president and chief operating officer and Manouch Moshayedi became CEO.

In March 2007, Mark Moshayedi was promoted to president. This same year, sTec became the industry's first supplier to deploy enterprise-class SSDs to OEMs.

In 2009, after announcing EMC Corporation as the sole customer of its ZeusIOPS enterprise SSDs, sTec sales reached a $1 billion market capitalization.

In April 2011, sTec announced it acquired the assets of Knowledge Quest Infotech Private Limited in Pune, India.

In September 2012, Mark Moshayedi was named sTec chief executive officer.

On June 24, 2013, Western Digital corporation announced sTec would become part of its HGST subsidiary, with a purchase price estimated at $340 million.

== Products ==
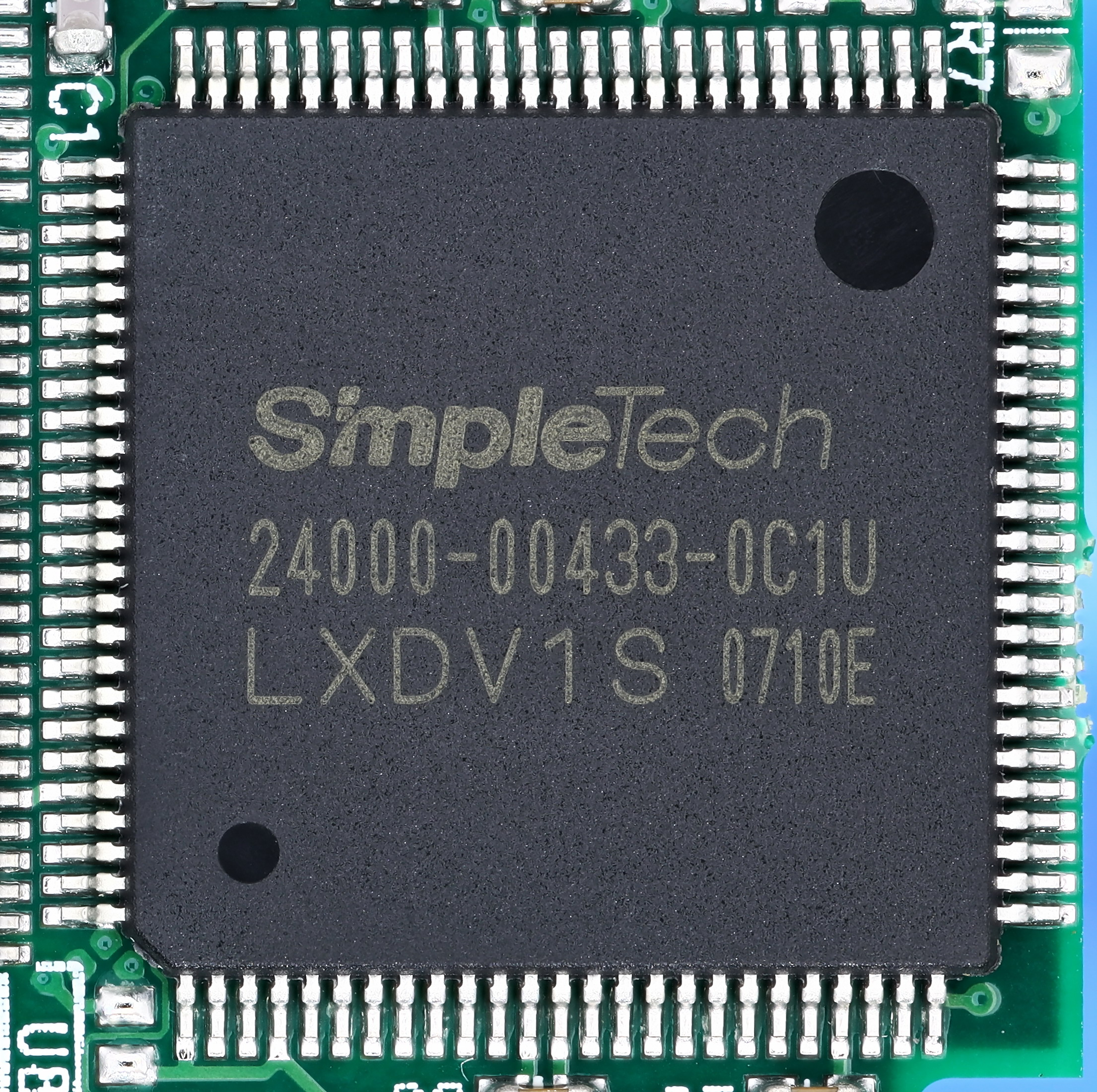
NAND Flash controller

SimpleTech is a consumer brand of external hard drives and backup products owned by Fabrik Inc. and designed to integrate computer hardware, software, and online services to help consumers store, protect, manage, and share digital content. The brand and product line was originally created by Simple Technology, a company founded in 1990, which later changed its name to SimpleTech in 2001.

The SimpleTech brand and consumer products included flash memory cards, USB flash drives, memory upgrades, and external and portable disk drive storage, to Fabrik in February 2007. Fabrik acquired the SimpleTech's storage platform to integrate and deliver backup and content management software and web services (FabrikUltimateBackup.com and Joggle.com), allowing consumers to store, access, manage and share their digital content.

The SimpleTech product line includes the Signature Mini USB Portable Drives, the Pro Drive family, and the environmentally friendly SimpleTech [re]drive. The original design of the SimpleTech portable external storage product line was inspired by the Ferrari design team Pininfarina.
