= Fusible core injection molding =

Plastic injection molding process

Fusible core injection molding, also known as lost core injection molding, is a specialized plastic injection molding process used to mold internal cavities or undercuts that are not possible to mold with demoldable cores. Strictly speaking the term "fusible core injection molding" refers to the use of a fusible alloy as the core material; when the core material is made from a soluble plastic the process is known as soluble core injection molding. This process is often used for automotive parts, such as intake manifolds and brake housings, however it is also used for aerospace parts, plumbing parts, bicycle wheels, and footwear.

The most common molding materials are glass-filled nylon 6 and nylon 66. Other materials include unfilled nylons, polyphenylene sulfide, glass-filled polyaryletherketone (PAEK), glass-filled polypropylene (PP), rigid thermoplastic urethane, and elastomeric thermoplastic polyurethane.

== History ==
The first patent for this type of molding process was taken out in 1968, however it was rarely used until the 1980s. That is when the automotive industry took interest in it to develop intake manifolds.

== Process ==
The process consists of three major steps: casting or molding a core, inserting the core into the mold and shooting the mold, and finally removing the molding and melting out the core.

=== Core ===
First, a core is molded or die cast in the shape of the cavity specified for the molded component. It can be made from a low melting point metal, such as a tin-bismuth alloy, or a polymer, such as a soluble acrylate. The polymer has approximately the same melting temperature as the alloy, 275 °F (135 °C), however the alloy ratios can be modified to alter the melting point. Another advantage to using a metal core is that multiple smaller cores can be cast with mating plugs and holes so they can be assembled into a final large core.

One key in casting metal cores is to make sure they do not contain any porosity as it will induce flaws into the molded part. In order to minimize porosity the metal may be gravity cast or the molding cavity may be pressurized. Another system slowly rocks the casting dies as the molding cavity fills to "shake" the air bubbles out.

The metal cores can be made from a number of low melting point alloys, with the most common being a mixture of 58% bismuth and 42% tin, which is used for molding nylon 66. One of the main reasons it is used is because it expands as it cools which packs the mold well. Other alloys include tin-lead-silver alloys and tin-lead-antimony alloys. Between these three alloy groups a melting point between 98 and 800 °F (37–425 °C) can be achieved.

Polymer cores are not as common as metal cores and are usually only used for moldings that require simple internal surface details. They are usually 0.125 to 0.25 in (3.2 to 6.4 mm) thick hollow cross-sections that are molded in two halves and are ultrasonically welded together. Their greatest advantage is that they can be molded in traditional injection molding machines that the company already has instead of investing into new die casting equipment and learning how to use it. Because of this polymer core materials are most adventitious for small production runs that cannot justify the added expense of metal cores. Unfortunately it is not as recyclable as the metal alloys used in cores, because 10% new material must be added with the recycled material.

=== Molding ===
In the second step, the core is then inserted into the mold. For simple molds this is as simple as inserting the core and closing the dies. However, more complex tools require multiple steps from the programmed robot. For instance, some complex tools can have multiple conventional side pulls that mate with the core to add rigidity to the core and reduce the core mass. After the core is loaded and the press closed the plastic is shot.

=== Melt-out ===
In the final step, the molded component and core are both demolded and the core is melted-out from the molding. This is done in a hot bath, via induction heating, or through a combination of the two. Hot baths usually use a tub filled with glycol or Lutron, which is a phenol-based liquid. The bath temperature is slightly higher than that of the core alloy's melting point, but not so high that it damages the molding. In typical commercial applications the parts are dipped into the hot bath via an overhead conveyor. The advantage to using a hot bath is that it is simpler than induction heating and it helps cure thermoset moldings. The disadvantage is that it is uneconomically slow at a cycle time of 60 to 90 minutes and it poses environmental cleanup issues. Typically the hot bath solution needs cleaning or replacement every year or every half year when used in combination with induction heating.

For thermoplastic moldings induction heating of the core metal is required, otherwise the prolonged heat from a hot bath can warp it. Induction heating reduces the melt-out time to one to three minutes. The disadvantage is that induction heating does not remove all of the core material so it must then be finished off in a hot bath or be brushed out. Another disadvantage is that the induction coils must be custom built for each molding because the coils must be 1 to 4 in (25 to 102 mm) from the part. Finally, induction heating systems cannot be used with moldings that have brass or steel inserts because the induction heating process can destroy or oxidize the insert.

For complex parts it can be difficult to get all of the core liquid to drain out in either melt-out process. In order to overcome this the parts may be rotated for up to an hour. Liquid core metal collects on the bottom of the heated bath and is usable for a new core.

=== Equipment ===
Traditional horizontal injection molding machines have been used since the mid-1980s, however loading and unloading 100 to 200 lb (45 to 91 kg) cores are difficult so two robots are required. Moreover, the cycle time is quite long, approximately 28 seconds. These problem are overcome by using rotary or shuttle action injection molding machines. These types of machines only require one robot to load and unload cores and have a 30% shorter cycle time. However, these types of machines cost approximately 35% more than horizontal machines, require more space, and require two bottom molds (because one is in the machine during the cycle and the other is being unloaded and loaded with a new core), which adds approximately 40% to the tooling cost. For small parts, horizontal injection molding machines are still used, because the core does not weigh enough to justify the use of a rotary machine.

For four-cylinder manifolds a 500-ton press is required; for a six- to eight-cylinder manifold a 600- to 800-ton press is required.

== Advantages and disadvantages ==
The greatest advantage of this process is its ability to produce single-piece injection moldings with highly complex interior geometries without secondary operations. Similarly shaped objects are usually made from aluminum castings, which can weigh 45% to 75% more than a comparable molding. The tooling also lasts longer than metal casting tooling due to the lack of chemical corrosion and wear. Other advantages include:

- Very good surface quality with no weak areas due to joints or welds
- High dimensional accuracy and structural integrity
- Not labor-intensive due to the few secondary operations required
- Little waste
- Inserts can be incorporated

Two of the major disadvantages of this process are the high cost and long development time. An automotive part can take four years to develop; two years in the prototype stage and two years to reach production. Not all products take this long, for instance a two-way valve produced by Johnson Controls only took 18 months. The initial cost can be as much as US$8 million to produce a four-cylinder engine manifold. However, computer flow analysis has helped reduce lead time and costs.

One of the difficulties that result from these long development times and high costs is making accurate cores repeatably. This is extremely important because the core is an integral part of the mold, so essentially each shot is into a new mold cavity. Another difficulty is keeping the core from melting when the plastic is shot into the mold, because the plastic is approximately twice the melting temperature of the core material. A third difficulty is the low strength of the core. Hollow plastic cores can collapse if too much pressure is used in the shot plastic. Metal cores (with low melting temperatures) are solid so they cannot collapse, but are only 10% as strong as steel cores so they can distort. This is especially a problem when molding manifolds, because the waviness of the core can be detrimental to the airflow within the runners.

Another disadvantage is the need for a large space to house the injection molding machines, casting machines, melt-out equipment, and robots.

Because of these disadvantages, some moldings that would be made via this process are instead made by injection molding two or more parts in a traditional injection molding machine and then welding them together. This process is less expensive and requires much less capital, however it imparts more design constraints. Because of the design constraints, sometimes parts are made with both processes to gain the advantages of both.

== Application ==
The application of the fusible core process is not limited just to the injection of thermoplastics, but with corresponding core alloys also to thermosetting plastic molding materials (duroplast). The fusible core process finds application, for example, for injection molded passenger car engine intake manifolds. By modifying the equipment, small molded parts like valves or pump housings can be manufactured, as the manufacture of the fusible cores and the injected parts can be carried out on an injection molding machine.

== See also ==
- Lost-wax casting
