= SanDisk Professional =

Professional storage products by Sandisk and Western Digital

- Product type: Hard disk drive; Solid-state drive
- Current owner: Sandisk (SSDs); Western Digital (HDDs)
- Country: United States
- Introduced: 2004; 22 years ago

SanDisk Professional (previously G-Technology) is a brand of external storage products designed and marketed for the Macintosh, creative pro, photography and A/V markets. Its USB, FireWire, eSATA, SAS, SCSI Thunderbolt, and Fibre Channel systems support all levels of audio/video production.

== History ==
In 2004, Medea Corporation, a manufacturer of storage systems optimized for digital content creation, was sold to Avid Technology. Medea co-founder Roger Mabon purchased the rights to one of Medea’s products from Avid – a two-drive RAID 0 storage system for creative professionals – and opened up his own startup company just blocks from his house in Santa Monica.

The company sold products to a local community of audio/video creative professionals until the company made an agreement in 2006 with Apple that greatly increased placement of their products in Apple stores in the United States, and raised their revenue from $20,000 a month in 2004 to millions.

In January 2008, Fabrik Inc. bought G-Technology for an undisclosed amount. That month, the company introduced the world’s first 500 GB 2.5” portable storage drive and the first 1 TB portable external storage drive at Macworld Expo. G-Technology announced the first family of external solid-state drives (SSD) at Macworld Expo 09.

Hitachi Global Storage Technologies (HGST) bought Fabrik and its G-Technology brand in 2009. HGST in turn was bought by Western Digital in 2012. G-Technology is currently a line of products sold by Western Digital.

Starting from 2021, G-Technology is rebranded by Western Digital into SanDisk Professional, while keeping G-Technology Heritage.

== Products ==
SanDisk Professional sells their external storage devices only to professionals under the product lines G-SPEED, G-RAID, G-SAFE, and G-DRIVE.

G-RAID is a line of portable external hard drive products used for field editing and backup for video producers and camera operators. The line supports RAID 0 (striped volume) and are encased in aircraft-grade aluminum for ruggedness.

G-RAID drives support multi-stream DV, HDV, DVCPro HD, XDCAM HD, ProRes 422 and uncompressed SD workflows and can be connected via FireWire 400, FireWire 800 and USB 2.0 ports.

The line also includes the G-RAID mini, a smaller version with no power cord, that’s powered by a FireWire plug into a computer or laptop. This smaller G-RAID mini comes in capacities up to 1TB in a RAID 0 or RAID 1 (mirroring).

G-SPEED is designed only for professional content creation applications used to edit and produce digital video and film productions.

The G-SPEED line includes desktop and server rack-mount products ranging up to 16TBs using 16 hot-swappable drives. The G-SPEED line has high-end performance specifications geared toward content producers, Fibre Channel products, 4GBit connectivity, and more.

It also includes the G-SPEED eS, which is a small desktop enclosure with four drives.

G-SAFE is optimized for professional digital photographers. It comes with RAID 1 functionality to protect digital photography.

G-SAFE products support both FireWire 800 and USB 2.0 connections.

G-DRIVE consists of single-drive external storage units that work with both Mac and Windows PCs to offer up to 10 TB capacities. G-DRIVE features support for FireWire 800, FireWire 400 and USB 2.0 connections. As of 2020, there is support for Thunderbolt 3 and USB 5Gbps.

The series also includes the G-DRIVE mini, a smaller version, and the G-DRIVE Q, which has more support options for FireWire 400, FireWire 800, USB 2.0 and eSATA ports in a single unit.
