= Hardcard =

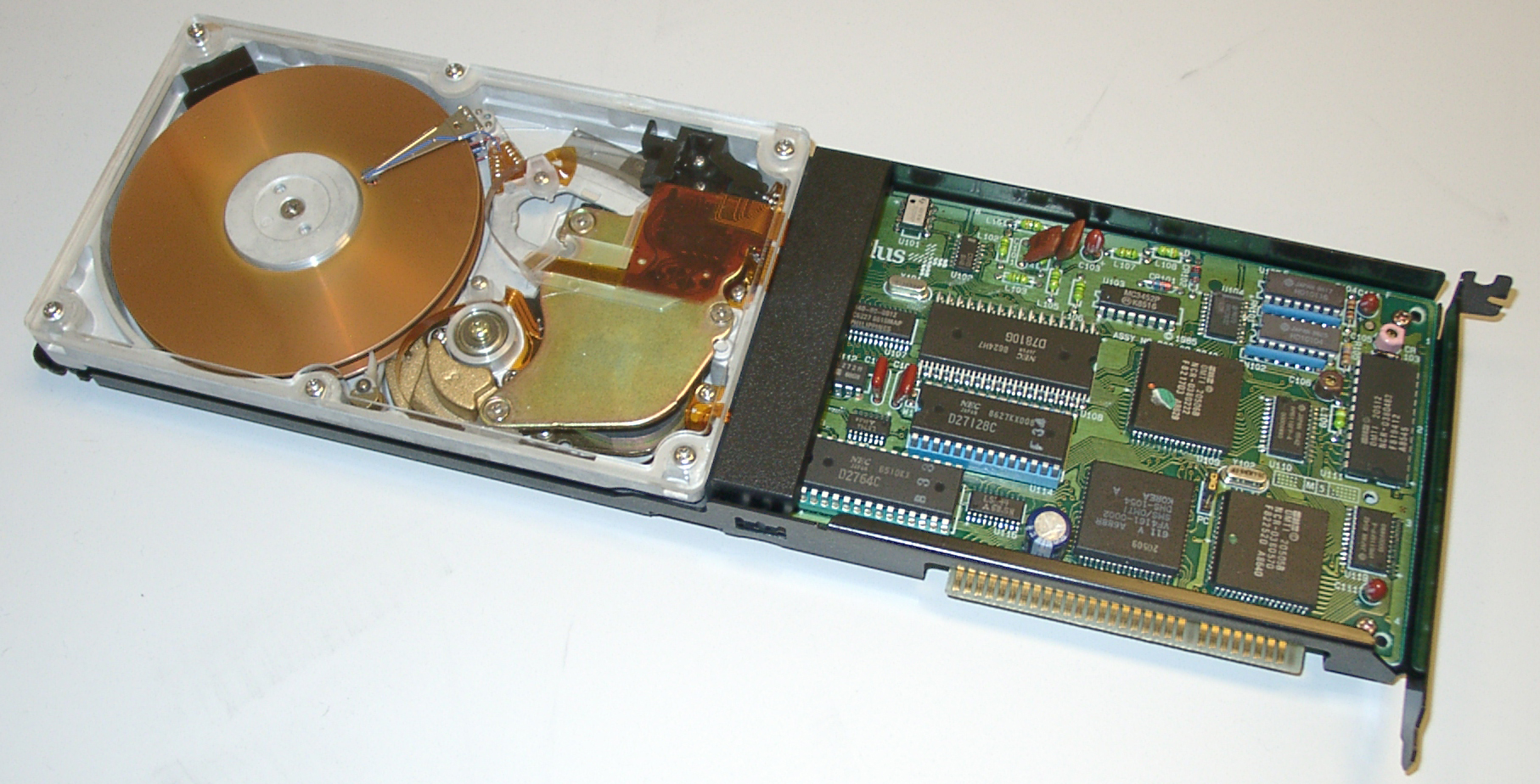
A Hardcard 20 hard disk on a card with an acrylic cover for display purposes.

Hardcard is the genericized trademark for a hard disk drive, disk controller, and host adapter on an expansion card for a personal computer.

Typically a hard disk drive (HDD) installs into a drive bay; cables connect the drive to a host adapter and power source. If the personal computer lacks an available bus on a compatible host adapter, then one may have to install an adapter into an expansion slot. The Hardcard supplies its own host adapter, and doesn't require an empty drive bay.

Plus Development, a subsidiary of Quantum Corporation, developed the first ISA Hardcard, and released it in October 1985. By June 1986, 28 of Plus Development's competitors were producing similar products. The term has been used generically to refer to any hard disk on a card.

== History ==
During the mid-1980s, many owners of the IBM PC and compatibles were reluctant to install hard drives because of the difficulty of doing so. PC Magazine described the process:

The typical hard disk installation requires the dexterity of a surgeon, the mechanical understanding of a watchmaker, and a hefty dollop of software genius. Once you break into your system unit, you have to sling cables, pry panels off, squeeze in a drive unit that invariably seems a few millimeters too large, then screw everything down (but more often up), and issue a bunch of program commands that sound like the army roster from Middle Earth.

Quantum Corporation formed the Plus Development subsidiary in 1983. Plus Development invested their efforts in developing a hard disk drive that the average computer owner could install easily without much technical knowledge.

By 1985, Plus Development had engineered their first Hardcard; it had a 10 megabyte (MB) capacity; its suggested retail price was $1,095. In the mid-1980s, hard drives were as small as 1.6 inches tall, but in order to fit into a single ISA PC card expansion slot a custom one-inch thick hard drive had to be designed. Having spent $15 million on the project, Plus Development started shipping Hardcard in October 1985, and trademarked the Hardcard brand in 1988.

The Hardcard provided the computer industry with the first one-inch-thick HDD, but it was an interface and form factor only compatible with the full length card slot of the ISA bus first introduced with the IBM PC. As such it had a thicker head disk assembly than the subsequently introduced 1-inch high standard form factor 3 1/2-inch HDDs.

While sources inside the company during the launch of Hardcard claim it was the first HDD controller integrated into the drive printed circuit board, Xebec, a HDD controller manufacturer in the early 1980s, had already done that with their Owl product around August 1984. It was a complete 5.25 inch half-height HDD with an integrated controller and drive electronics on the same printed circuit board with a SASI interface.

== Plus Development's Hardcard products ==
After the introduction of Hardcard, Plus Development continued working on higher capacity hard drives in the same form factor of the first Hardcard. The brand name became so widely known the name was continued through the follow on products.

Plus Hardcard Models
Product Name	Capacity (MB)	Access Time (ms)	First Shipment
Hardcard	10	65	October 1985
Hardcard 20	20	49	June 1986
Hardcard 40	40	35	May 1987
Hardcard II 80	80	25 (19 effective)	January 1990
Hardcard II 40	40	25 (19 effective)	January 1990
Hardcard II XL 105	105	9 (effective)	October 1990
Hardcard II XL 50	50	9 (effective)	October 1990
Hardcard EZ 240	240	16	September 1992
Hardcard EZ 127	127	17	September 1992
Hardcard EZ 85	85	17	September 1992
Hardcard EZ 42	42	19	September 1992

The Hardcard II and Hardcard II XL were advertised with effective access times as a result of the disk cache. The Hardcard II listed both times, but Hardcard II XL only listed the effective access time. The Hardcard EZ line returned to listing the access times without the benefit of the cache.

All Hardcard products up to and including Hardcard II XL were produced under the Plus Development name. The Hardcard EZ was released under the Quantum name after Quantum absorbed the wholly owned subsidiary Plus Development.

== Reception ==
Hardcard surprised the computer industry, which had believed that fitting a hard disk and drive controller onto the same card was impossible. Describing it as "an exemplar of the art of miniaturization", PC Magazine in December 1985 wrote that "installing the Hardcard is hardly more difficult than plugging in a multifunction card, a job easily within the range of anyone with the ordinary allocation of thumbs". The magazine also approved of utility software already being present on the preformatted hard drive, and performance comparable to that of physically larger drives. Also citing its competitive price, PC concluded that Hardcard was "a genuinely revolutionary product". PC Tech Journal in February 1986 approved of Hardcard's easy installation and thin form factor, successfully using it in a IBM Portable PC, and reported excellent read performance. The magazine questioned its $1095 list price, however, stating that "at $600 the Hardcard probably would be a runaway best seller; as it is, an additional $500 is hard to justify". "No one had expected this product", PC Tech Journal wrote elsewhere in the issue when naming it Product of the Month. The magazine described Hardcard's thinness, rugged drive mechanism ("wonder of mechanical compaction"), and highly integrated electronics as technical breakthroughs. While reiterating that the price was too high, PC Tech Journal predicted that imitators would not soon match Hardcard's innovative engineering.

== Competition ==
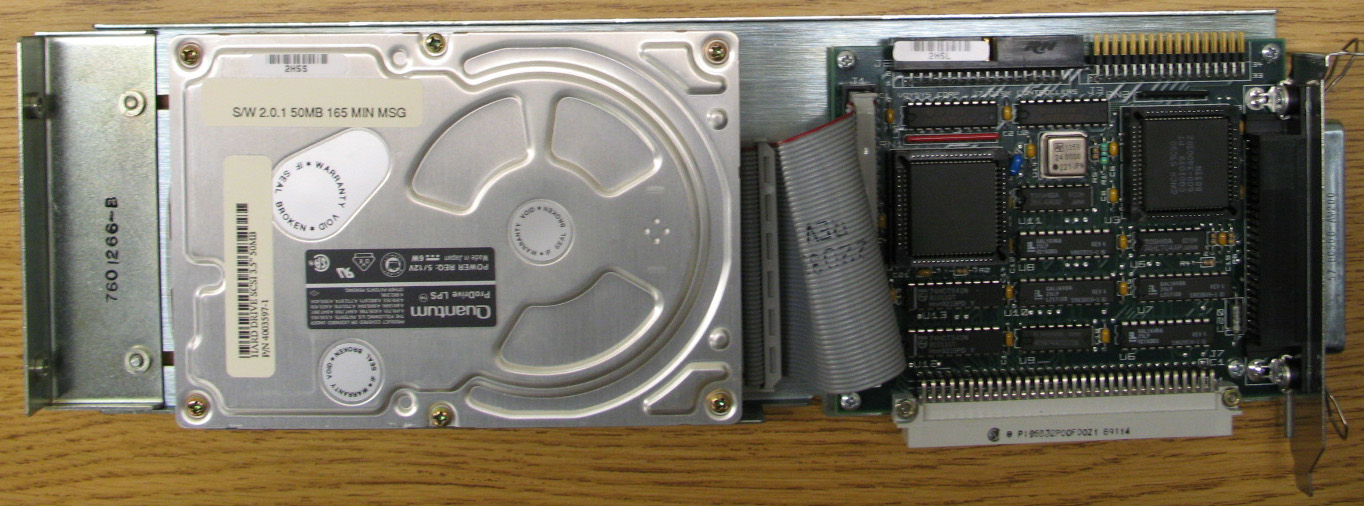
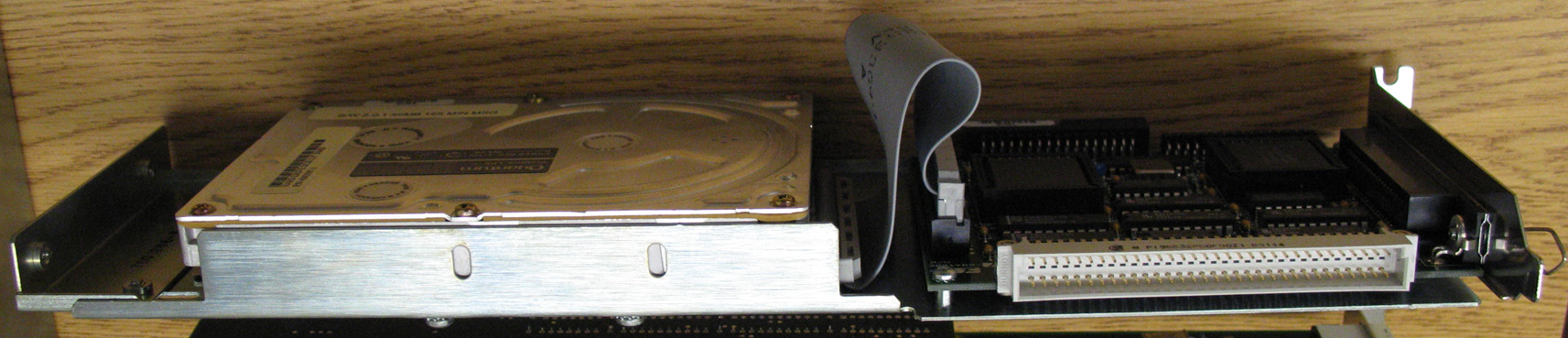
A generic hard disk card from a 1993 Nortel telephone voice messaging system.

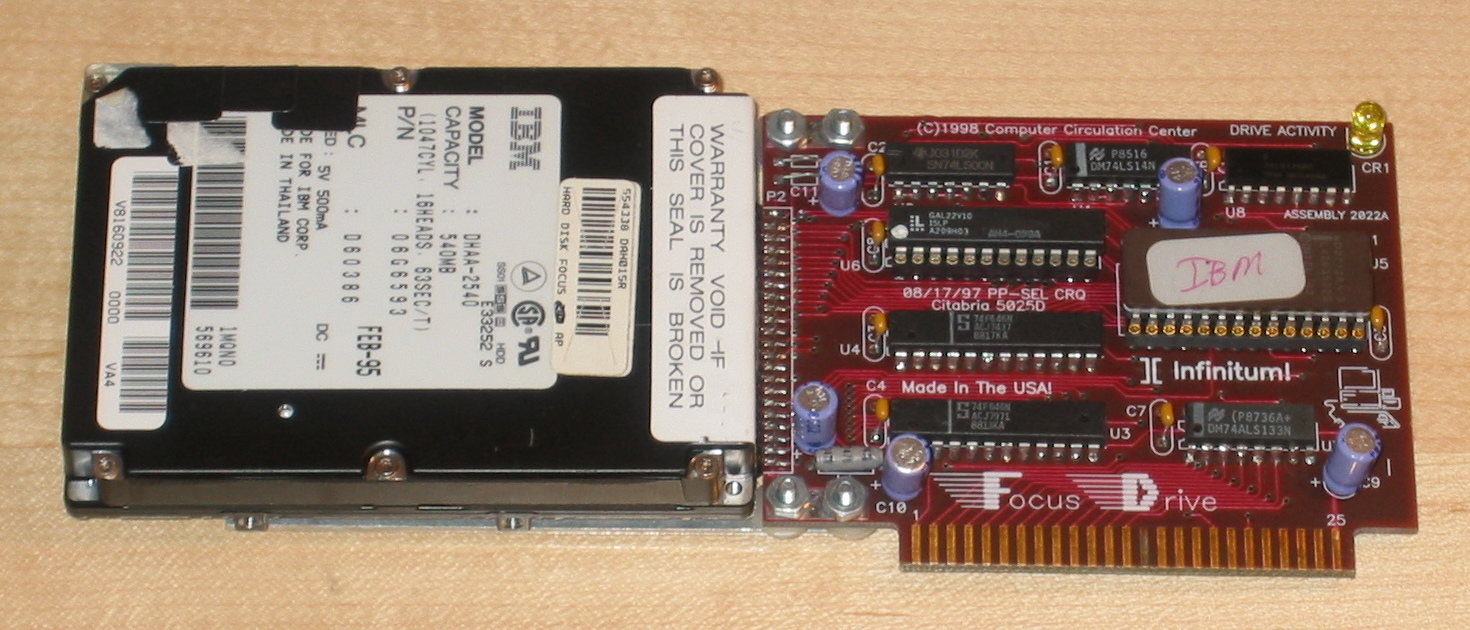
2,5″ hard disk drive (540 MB) at an expansion card for the Apple II

Within six months of the introduction of Hardcard more than one half dozen companies had released similar products, some with larger, 20MB drives. Demand was so strong that several OEM vendors such as Tandon Corporation introduced retail products. Hardcards' popularity encouraged general adoption of the 3 1/2-inch form factor for hard drives over the older 5 1/4-inch size, which cannot fit on an expansion card.

28 companies released similar products within one year of the first Hardcard. At that time, all of the other products were using a standard hard drive with a 1.6-inch height forcing the card to hang over the adjacent PC slot. The hard drive was located on the opposite side away from the connector sometimes enabling a short half-length expansion card to be installed in the adjacent slot. These hard drive cards were usually described as occupying 1.5 expansion slots. Below are some of companies and product names with a similar product to the Plus Hardcard.

- JVC (Japan Victor Company)
- Kamerman Labs, (Beaverton, Oregon) – Slot Machine
- Maynard Electronics, (Casselberry, Florida) – On Board
- Microscience International Corp, (Mountain View, California) – EasyCard
- Mountain Computer Inc., (Scotts Valley, California) – DriveCard
- Qubie Distributing, (Camarillo, California) – Hardpack
- Tandon Corporation, (Chatsworth, California) – DiskCard, Business Card
- Verbatim Corporation, (Sunnyvale, California) – Data Bank
- Western Digital, (Irvine, California) – FileCard

== Tandy 1000 ==
In 1985, Tandy introduced the Tandy 1000. Tandy offered a proprietary 20 megabyte hard card for $799. An 8-bit ISA slot was required to accommodate a hard card, preserving the drive bays for disk drives and, eventually, CD-ROM drives. The 8-bit slots were electronically compatible, but the computer could only hold a card up to 10 1/2 inches long. As a result, many hard cards such as those offered by Plus development were 13 inches long, and hence were not compatible. Hard cards had to be drives as Tandy compatible, meaning they fit in a Tandy 1000 model such as the SX, TX, SL, and TL series.

A hard card must be no more than 10 inches long and use an 8-bit ISA interface to work in a Tandy 1000 computer. Usually, the card must be installed in slot 1 due to the overhang. The Tandy 1000's 60 watt power supply isn't sufficient to run some hard cards, so a more power-efficient card was preferable.

== See also ==
- NVM Express, specification for installing solid-state drives as PCIe expansion cards
