= James Sedin =

American ice hockey player (1930–2021)

Personal information
- Born: June 25, 1930 Saint Paul, Minnesota, US
- Died: February 23, 2021 (aged 90) Ketchum, Idaho, US
Medal record
Men's Ice Hockey
Silver medal – second place	1952 Oslo	Team

James Walter "Jim" Sedin (June 25, 1930 – February 23, 2021) was an American ice hockey player. He won a silver medal at the 1952 Winter Olympics.

Sedin later became the CEO of Mountain Computer, a major peripheral vendor for the Apple II and the IBM Personal Computer, a role which he held from 1977 to the early 1990s.
