= List of computer bus interfaces =

This is a partial list of expansion bus interfaces, or expansion card slots, for installation of expansion cards.

== Bus interfaces ==
Interface name	Year introduced	Connector	Max transfer	Main use	Notes
CAMAC	1972			Processor independent	Industry use.
S-100	1974	2×50 2.54 mm card edge		Designed around Intel 8080 but used with other processors too	Homebrew and industry use.
VME	1981	DIN 41612	10 MByte/s	Motorola 68000 based	Industry use.
STEbus	1983	DIN 41612 a+c rows	?	Processor independent based	Industrial quality bus, 8-bit data / 20-bit address. Eurocard sized.
Acorn system bus	1979	DIN 41612 a+b rows	?	6502 based	8-bit data / 16-bit address.
ISA-8	1981	2×31 2.54 mm	1.99 MByte/s	IBM PC	Widespread.
ISA-16	1984	2×31 + 2×18 2.54 mm	3.97 MByte/s	IBM AT	Widespread.
Amiga Zorro II	1985	2×50 2.54 mm card edge	3.56 MByte/s	Amiga	Auto configuration.
Micro Channel	1987	edge card	40 MByte/s	IBM PS/2	32-bit and 16-bit versions
EISA	1988	edge card	20 MByte/s	IBM clones	32-bit version of ISA-16 more or less.
NuBus	1987	DIN 41612	40 MByte/s	NeXT, Macintosh II	
Amiga Zorro III	1990	2×50 2.54 mm card edge	150 MByte/s	Amiga	Multiplexed 32-bit.
PDS	1990	DIN 41612		Macintosh LC	
PCI-32/33	1993	card edge	133 MByte/s		Widespread.
PCI Express	2004	card edge	250 MByte/s		P2P highspeed PCI.
VPX	2004	MultiGig RT2	?	Provides VMEbus-based systems with support for switched fabrics. Designed specifically with defense applications in mind. Working group is OpenVPX.	VPX computer bus standard - V -VME and P -PCI and X the extents for both buses standards.
VXI	1987		160 MByte/s	Multivendor standard for automated testing expansion cards. Working group is VXIConsortium.	

Bus interfaces

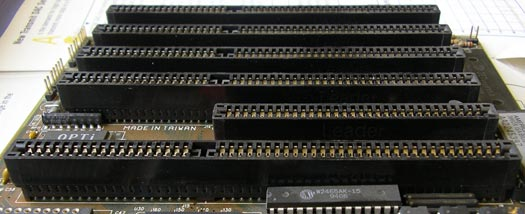
ISA

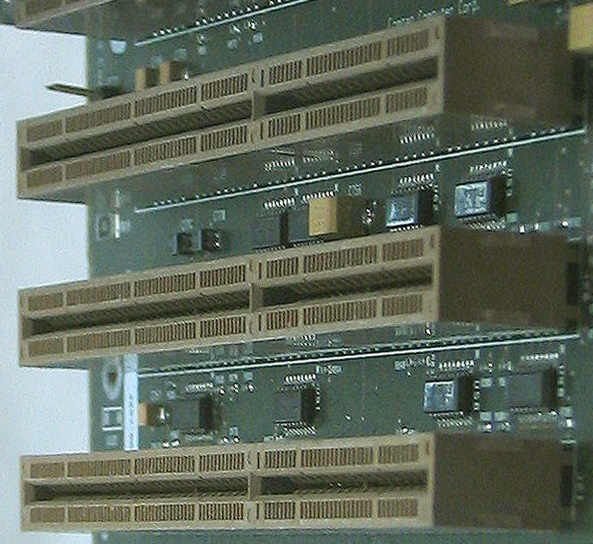
EISA

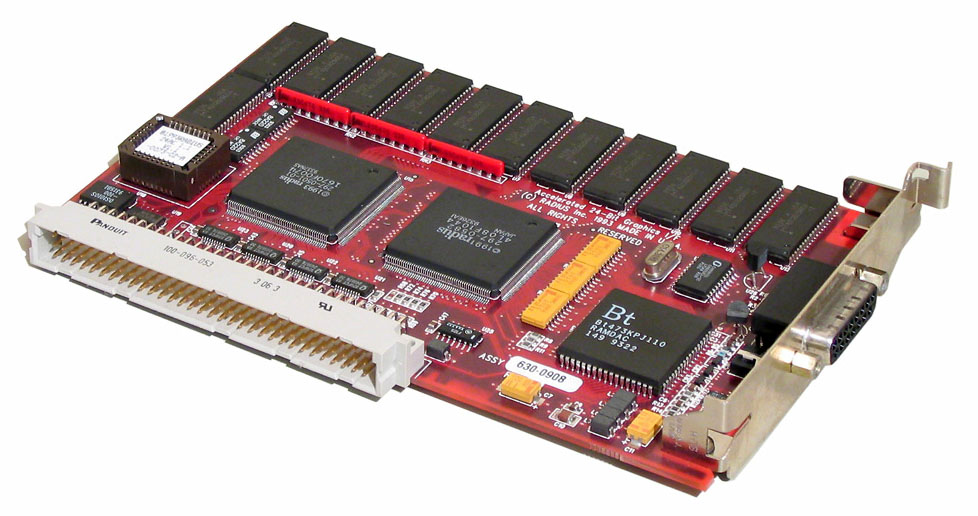
NuBus

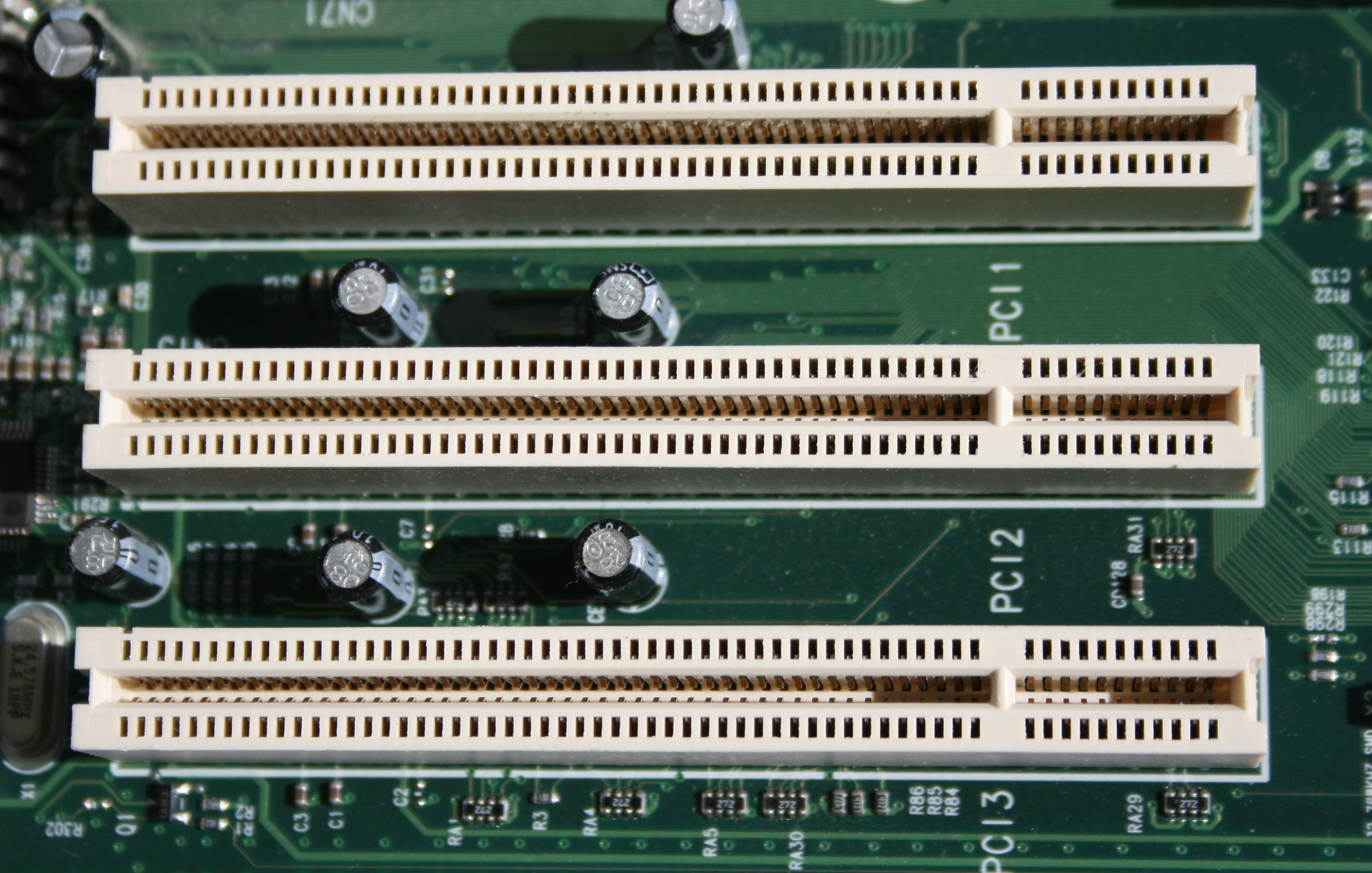
PCI

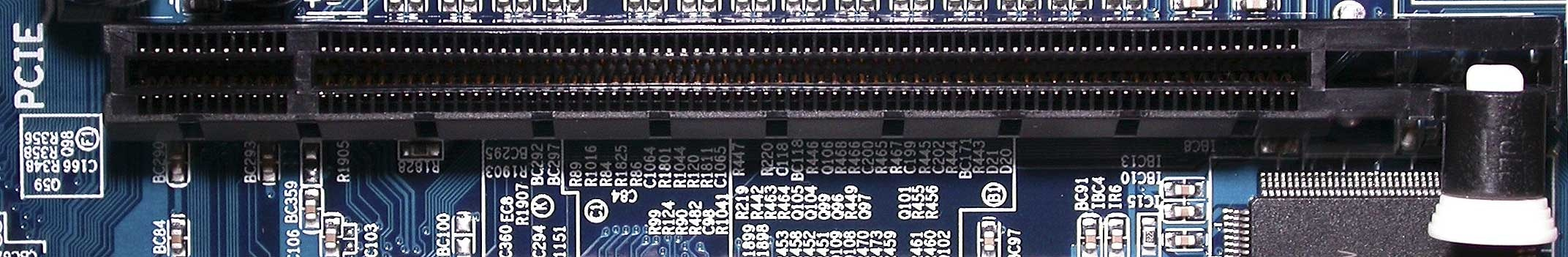
PCI Express ×16 slot

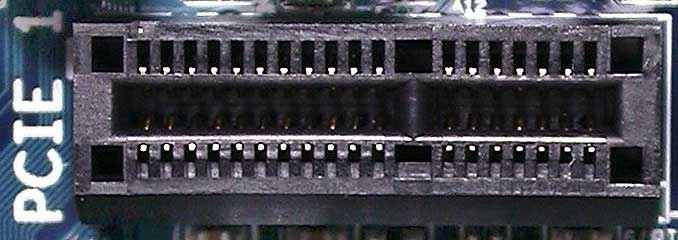
PCI Express ×1 slot

== See also ==
- List of interface bit rates
