= International Forum Design =

German Hanover-based design company

iF International Forum Design GmbH
- Organization logo
- Type: GmbH
- Industry: Design
- Headquarters: Hanover, Germany
- Website: www.ifdesign.de

iF International Forum Design GmbH (iF) is a Hanover-based organization providing design-related services.

== Foundation ==
International Forum Design was launched in 2001, as the operative business arm of design promotion company iF Industrie Forum Design Hannover e.V. (founded in 1953). International Forum Design and Industrie Forum Design are known internationally for awarding the annual iF product design awards.

== Overview ==
Industrie Forum Design Hannover was established in 1953 as "Die gute Industrieform" ("Good Industrial Form") by Deutsche Messe AG (then known as Deutsche Messe- und Ausstellungs- AG); the Working Party on Industrial Design within the Federation of German Industries (BDI); and other design corporations. It is located in the Hanover exhibition center, and was founded to promote industrial goods by organizing and promoting exhibitions. The company held its first exhibition in 1953, and has awarded the iF design awards annually since 1954. In 2001, managing director Ralph Wiegmann launched International Forum Design to oversee iF's business operations.
