= Alberto Meda =

Italian engineer and industrial designer

- Born: 1945
- Occupation: Designer
- Awards: Honorary Royal Designer for Industry (2005)
- Website: albertomeda.com

Alberto Meda (born 1945) is an Italian engineer and designer. His work is held in museums around the world. He lives in Milan.

== Early life ==
Meda was born in Tremezzina, in the Italian province of Como in 1945, and graduated with a laurea in mechanical engineering at the Politecnico di Milano in 1969.

== Career ==
In 1973 he became the technical director and head of planning at Kartell, in charge of furniture and plastic laboratory equipment projects.

=== Design ===
In 1979 he worked as a freelance industrial designer for companies such as Alfa Romeo Auto, Alias, Alessi, Arabia-Finland, Cinelli, Colombo design, Brevetti Gaggia, JCDecaux, Ideal Standard, Luceplan, Legrand, Mandarina Duck, Omron Japan, Philips, Olivetti, and Vitra.

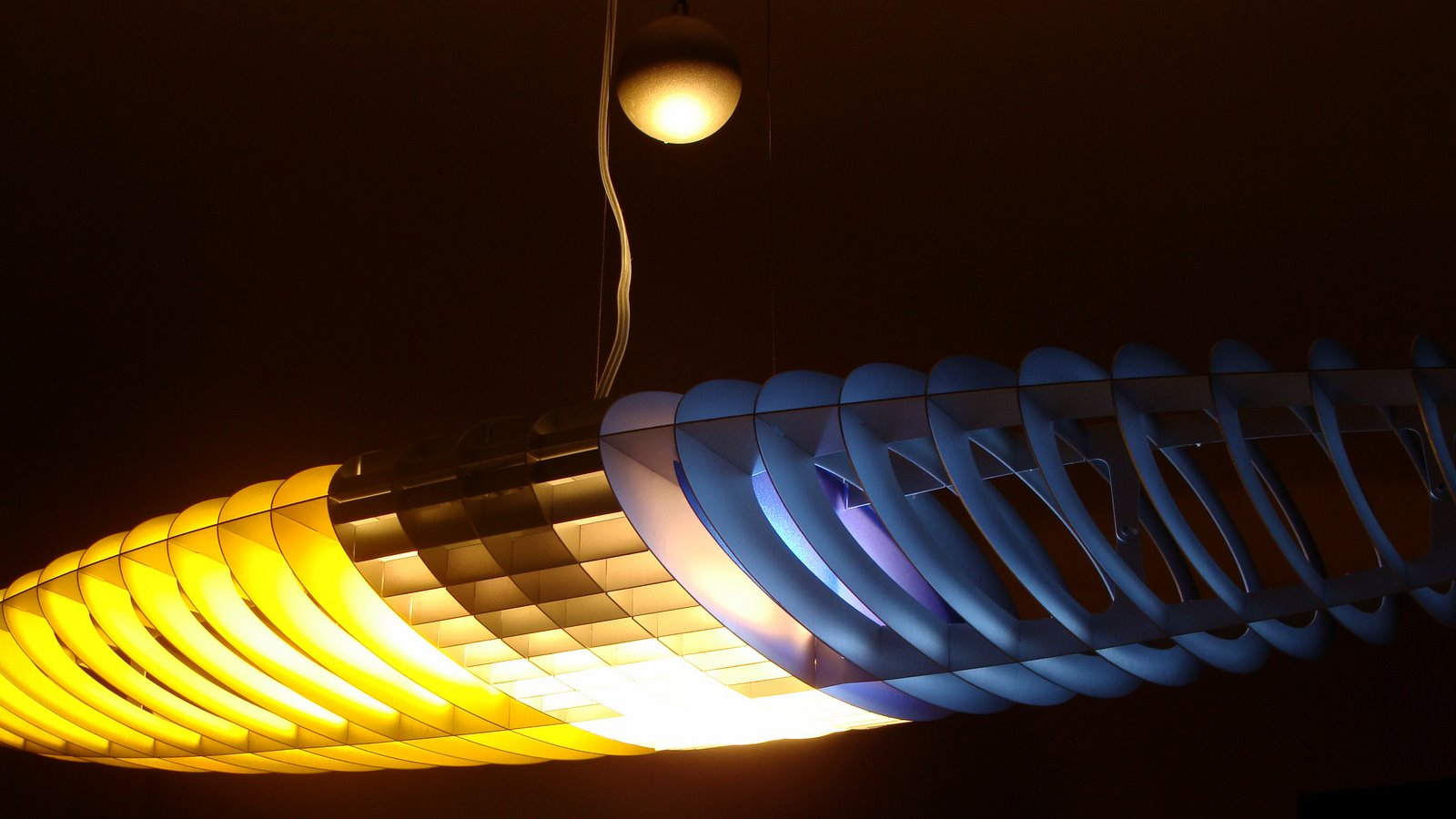
Titania pendant light designed for Luceplan (with Paolo Rizzato), 1989

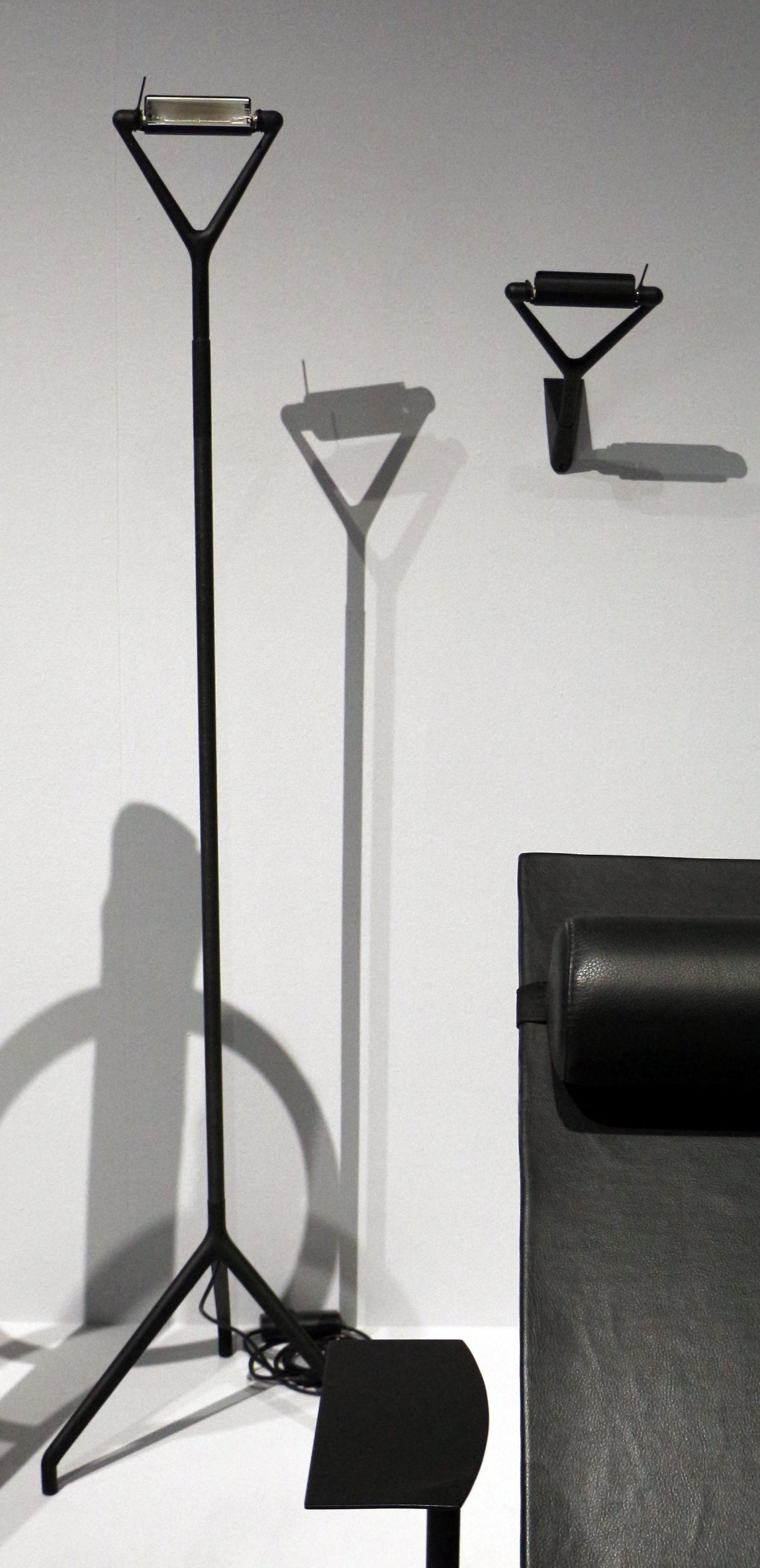
Lola lamp designed for Luceplan (with Paolo Rizzato), 1987

Meda came to design from engineering, bringing a pragmatic approach and attention to details in materials and production process. His applied science background shaped designs that are modern in form, and organic in feel. This sophistication caught the eye of Rolf Fehlbaum, chairman of Swiss manufacturer Vitra, who commissioned the engineer to design a chair. This collaboration resulted in seating pieces such as the MedaPro and the MedaPal.

=== Teaching and research ===
From 1983 he was a lecturer on industrial technology at Domus Academy, which lasted until 1987. He conducted seminars at International Design Symposium in Fukui, at Workshop Design Quest in Osaka, and at Design Center in Tokyo. From 1995 he was a lecturer at Politecnico of Milan "Corso di Laurea di Disegno Industriale" with a design lab.

From 1995 to 1997 he was a member of Board of Designlabor Bremerhaven.

From 2003 to 2007 he lectured at IUAV in Venice with design workshops.

In 2016, he became a member of the Scientific Committee of the Fondazione Politecnico di Milano.

He gave lectures and seminars at Chicago, Washington University, in Stockholm, Miami, San Paulo, Taipei, Ulm, Istanbul, Toronto, Mexico, Hong Kong, Firenze, Oslo, Istanbul, Lausanne, and Seoul.

== Recognition ==
=== Museums ===
Meda's designs are held in the permanent collection of museums such as the Museum of Modern Art of Toyama, the Museum of Modern Art in New York. Examples of these works include the "Light light " chair (1987), the "Soft light" chair (1989), the "Longframe" by Alias (1991), and the "On-Off" lamp by Luceplan (1988).

In 2023 the Triennale di Milano staged a retrospective in of his work titled Alberto Meda: Tension and Lightness.

=== Awards ===
| Award | Year | Object | Company |
|---|---|---|---|
| Compasso d'oro | 1989 | Lola lamp | Luceplan |
| Compasso d'oro | 1994 | "Metropoli" lamps | Luceplan |
| Compasso d'oro | 2008 | MIX lamp | Luceplan |
| Compasso d'oro | 2011 | Teak table | Alias |
| Compasso d'oro | 2016 | Flap acoustic panel | Caimi Brevetti |
| Compasso d'oro | 2018 | Origami screen-radiator | Tubes |

- 1990"Creativitalia" (Tokio1990) e una personale alla Design Gallery di Matzuia Ginza
- 1992 XVIII Triennale, 'La leggerezza' sezione del 'Il Giardino delle cose'
- 1992 "Design Plus" Titania lamp, Luceplan
- 1993 "Mestieri d'autore" (Siena)
- 1994 "European Design Prize", Luceplan
- 1995 "Mutant materials in contemporary design" al MOMA-(New York)
- 1995 "Industrie Forum design" Hannover UNI – X family lamps
- 1996 "Meda-Rizzatto" alla Galerie Binnen (Amsterdam)
- 1996 "Industrie Forum design" Hannover Titania Clamp lamp
- 1997 Good design Gold Prize–Japan Meda chair, Vitra
- 1998 I.D design review 'Best of category' Meda chair, Vitra
- 1999 Designer of the year, personale al Salon du Meuble (Parigi)
- 1999 Designer of the year, Salon du Meuble de Paris
- 2000 Bundespreis Produktdesign, Meda chair, Vitra
- 2001 "Italia e Giappone: design come stile di vita" (Yokohama, kobe)
- 2001 Good Design Award Chicago Athenaeum Water Jug, Arabia
- 2002 Reddot Award knives, Iittala Finland
- 2005 "Hounorary Royal Designer for Industry" Londra RSA
- 2006 "Design Plus" e "Light of the future" MIX lamp, Luceplan
- 2007 "INDEX:award" Solar Bottle
- 2008 Design and Elastic Mind- (MOMA)
- 2012 Best of – Design Plus per OttoWatt, Luceplan
- 2014 Triennale di Milano Il Design Italiano oltre le crisi
- 2014 Best of Neocon (U.S.A) Silver Award Flap, Caimi Brevetti
- 2015 Youthful – spazio Domus, (Milano)
- 2015 The Bauhaus#itsalldesign. (Vitra Design Museum)
- 2015 German Design Award Flap, Caimi Brevetti
- 2016 DesignEuropa Awards (EUIPO) Flap, Caimi Brevetti
- 2016 Good Design Award Chicago Athenaeum Origami, Tubes
- 2017 Red Dot with Frame 52, Alias
- 2018 Red Dot Best of the Best with Aledin lamp, Kartell
