= Gravity casting =

Metal fabrication technique

Gravity casting is among the oldest known processes for fabricating metals and metal alloys. It involves the pouring of molten metal from a crucible into a mold under only the force of gravity, without the use of pressurized gases, vacuums, or centrifugal force. Small-scale molds used for this form of casting have most commonly been made of sand, tufa stone, and cuttlebone as well as charcoal and plaster as these materials are generally easy to shape (unlike iron or steel), do not break down when suddenly exposed to high temperatures (unlike glass, wood, or plastic), do not deform easily (unlike silicone) and are widely available.
