= Industry Standard Architecture =

Internal expansion bus in early PC compatibles

ISA
- Industry Standard Architecture
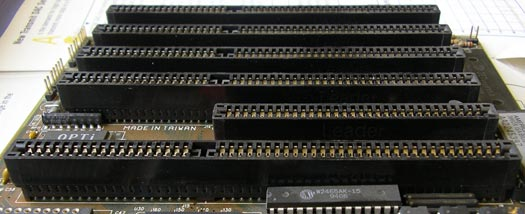
- One 8-bit and five 16-bit ISA slots on a motherboard
- Year created: 1981; 45 years ago
- Created by: IBM
- Superseded by: PCI, LPC (1993, 1998)
- Width in bits: 8 or 16
- No. of devices: up to 6 devices
- Speed: Half-duplex 8 MB/s or 16 MB/s
- Style: Parallel
- Hotplugging interface: No
- External interface: No

Industry Standard Architecture (ISA) is the 16-bit internal bus of IBM PC/AT and similar computers based on the Intel 80286 and its immediate successors during the 1980s. The bus was (largely) backward compatible with the 8-bit bus of the 8088-based IBM PC, including the IBM PC/XT as well as IBM PC compatibles.

Originally referred to as the PC bus (8-bit) or AT bus (16-bit), it was also termed I/O Channel by IBM. The ISA term was coined as a retronym by IBM PC clone manufacturers in the late 1980s or early 1990s as a reaction to IBM's attempts to replace the AT bus with its new and incompatible Micro Channel architecture.

The 16-bit ISA bus was also used with 32-bit processors for several years. An attempt to extend it to 32 bits, called Extended Industry Standard Architecture (EISA), was not very successful, however. Later buses such as VESA Local Bus and PCI were used instead, often along with ISA slots on the same mainboard. Derivatives of the AT bus structure were and still are used in ATA/IDE, the PCMCIA standard, CompactFlash, the PC/104 bus, and internally within Super I/O chips.

Even though ISA disappeared from consumer desktops many years ago, it is still used in industrial PCs, where certain specialized expansion cards that never transitioned to PCI and PCI Express are used.

== History ==
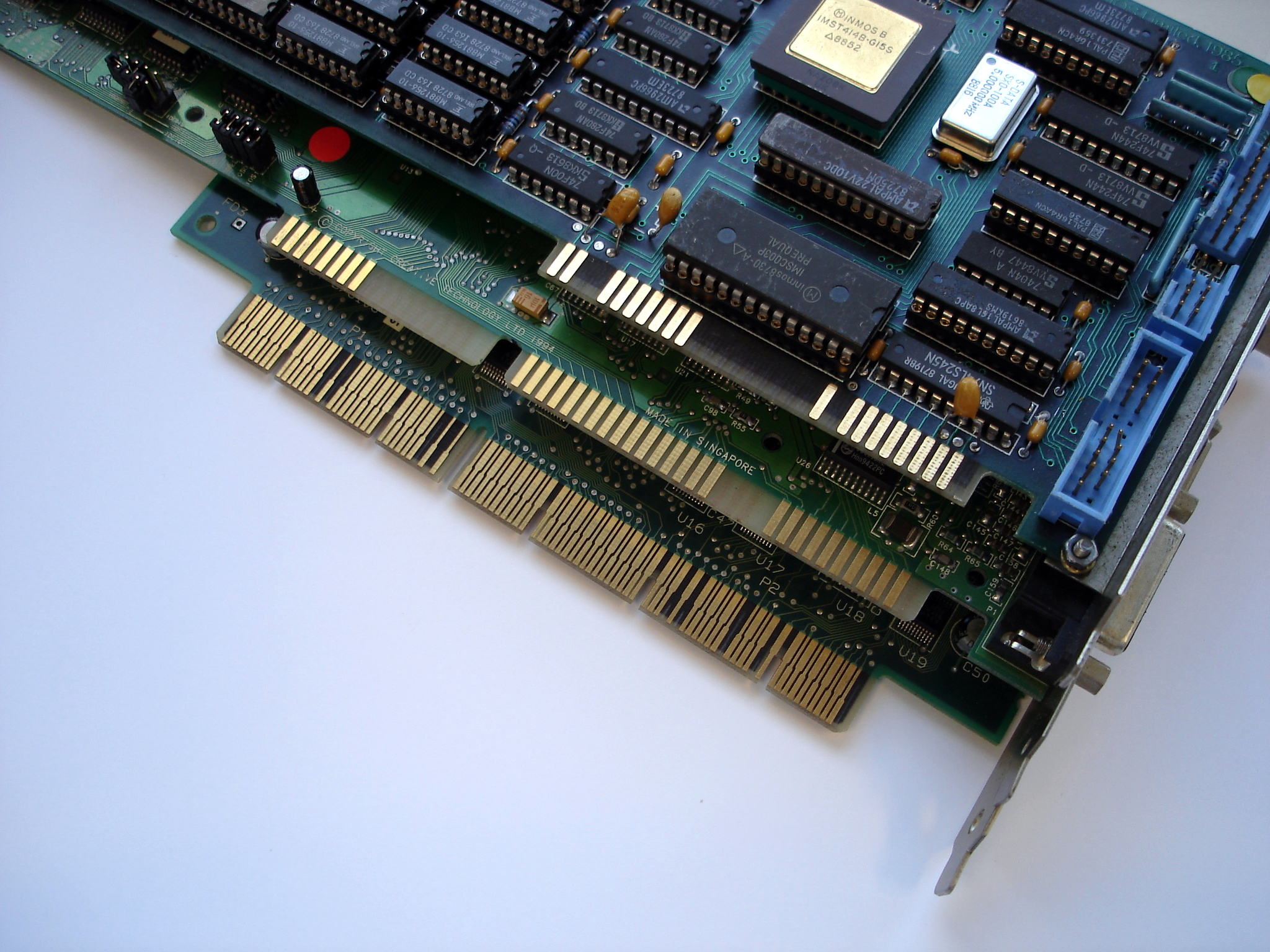
8-bit XT, 16-bit ISA, EISA (top to bottom)

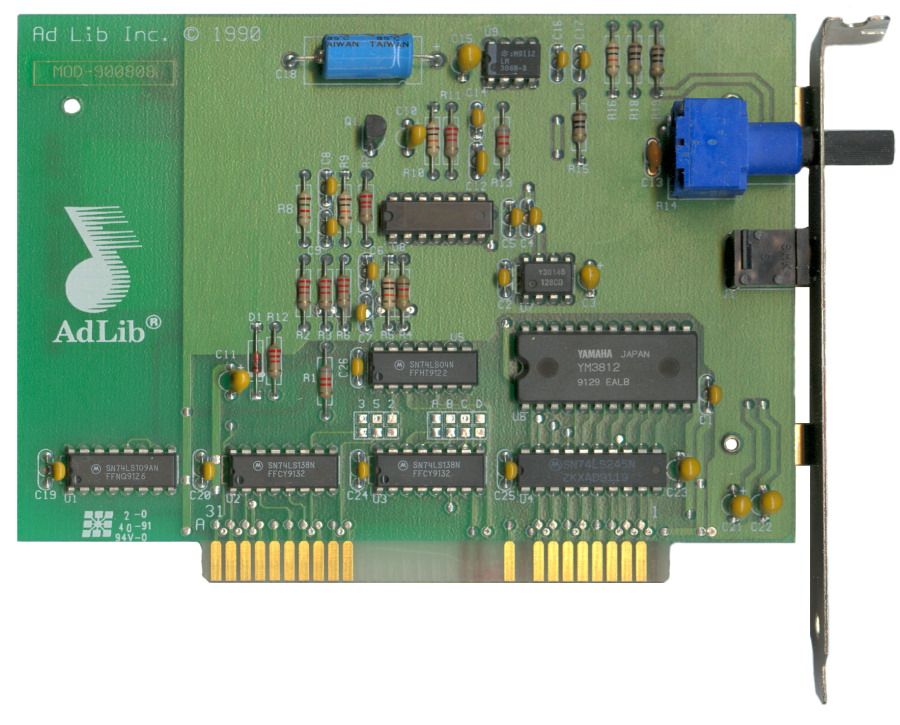
8-bit XT: Adlib FM Sound card

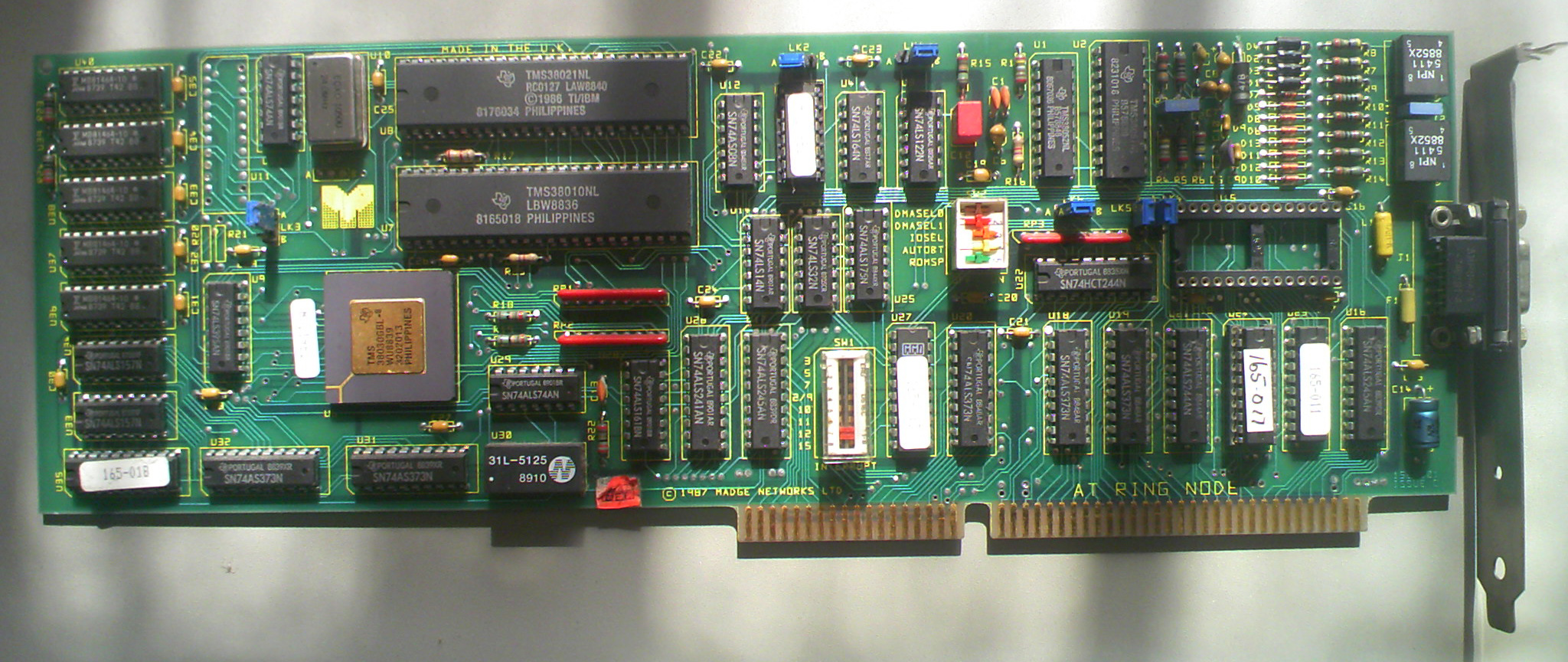
16-bit ISA: Madge 4/16 Mbps Token Ring NIC

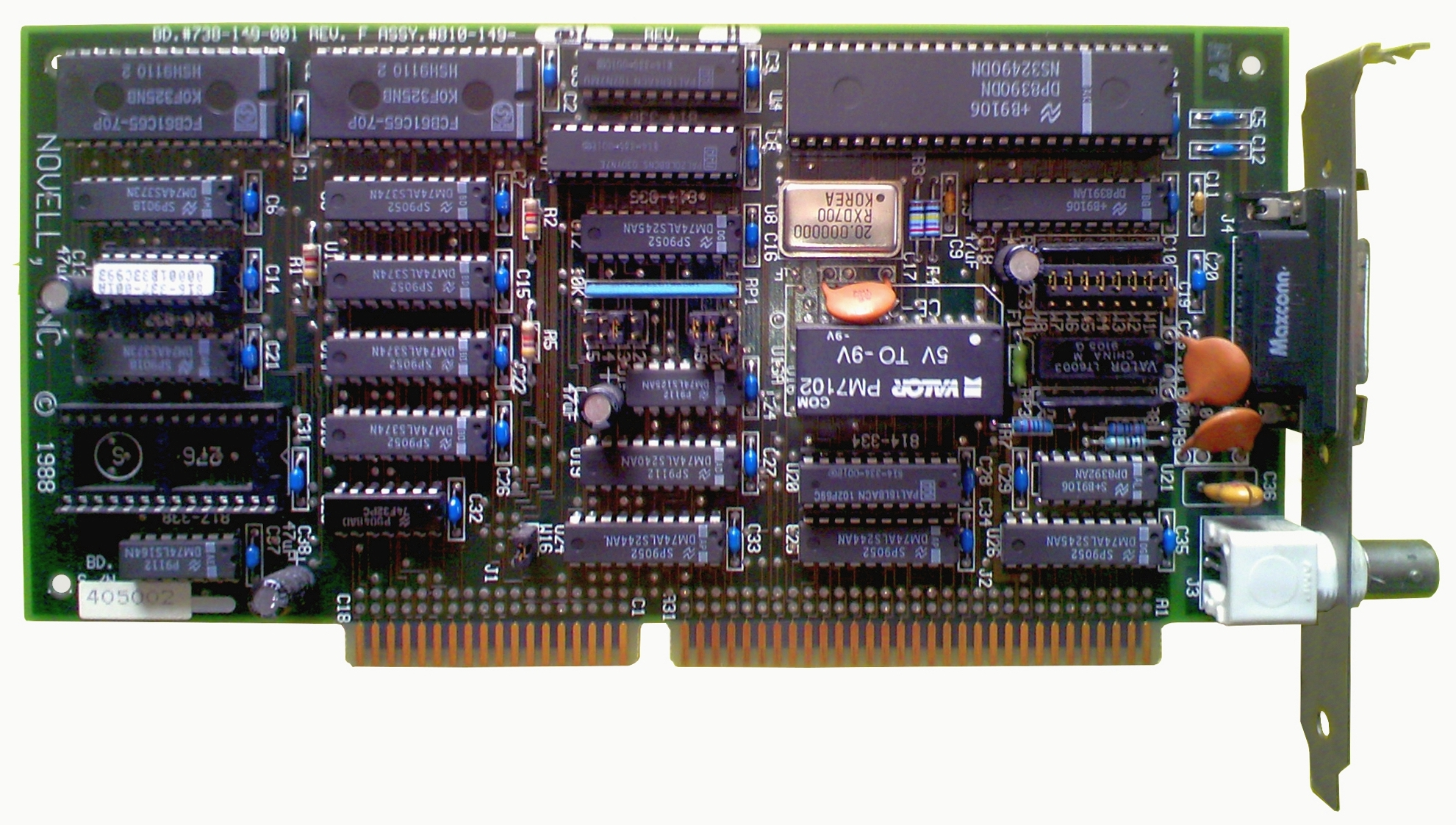
16-bit ISA: Ethernet 10BASE-5/2 NIC

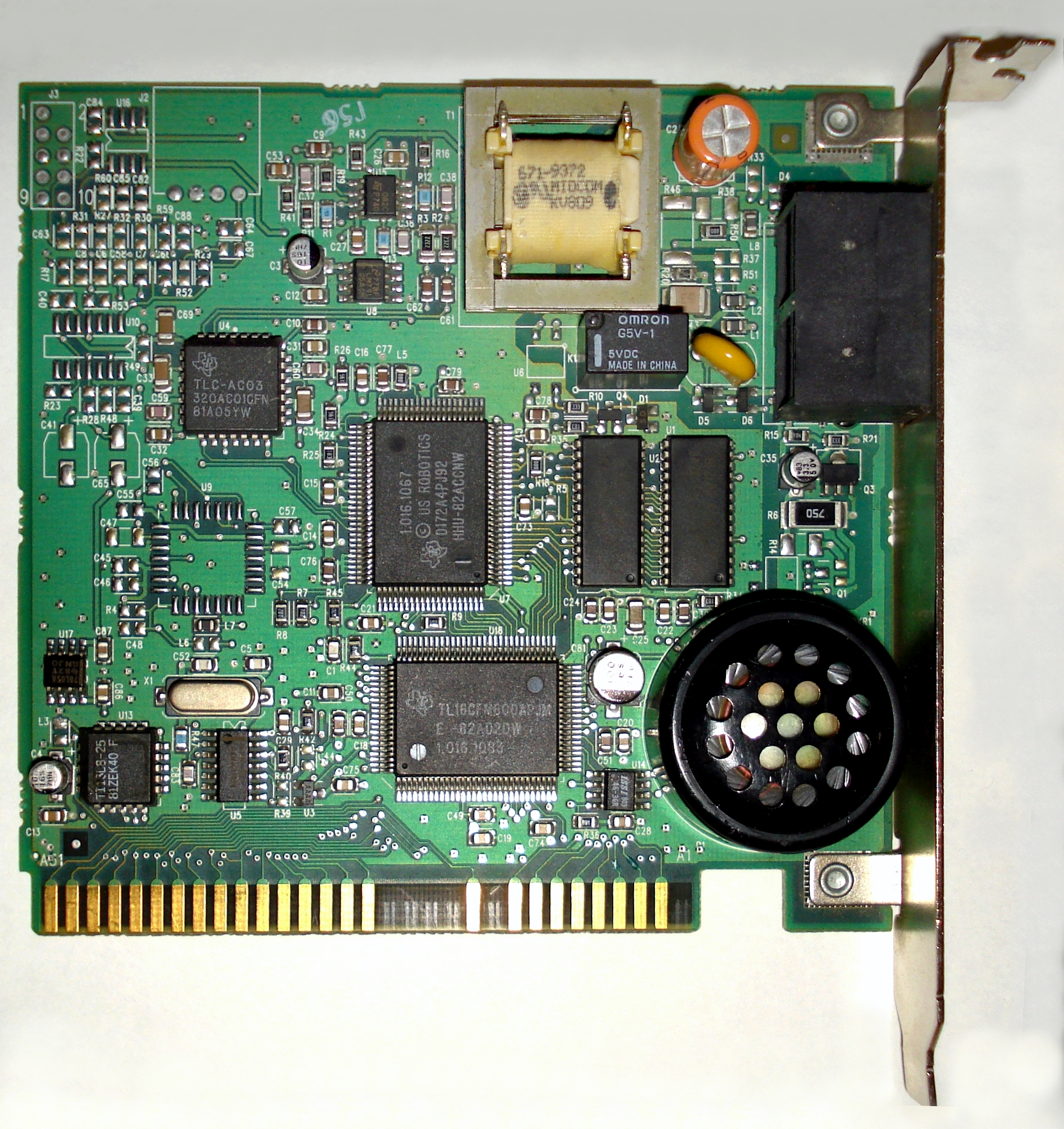
8-bit XT: USRobotics 56k Modem

The original PC bus was developed by a team led by Mark Dean at IBM as part of the IBM PC project in 1981. It was an 8-bit bus based on the I/O bus of the IBM System/23 Datamaster system - it used the same physical connector, and a similar signal protocol and pinout. A 16-bit version, the IBM AT bus, was introduced with the release of the IBM PC/AT in 1984. The AT bus was a mostly backward-compatible extension of the PC bus—the AT bus connector was a superset of the PC bus connector. In 1988, the 32-bit EISA standard was proposed by the Gang of Nine group of PC-compatible manufacturers that included Compaq. Compaq created the term Industry Standard Architecture (ISA) to replace PC compatible. In the process, they retroactively renamed the AT bus to ISA to avoid infringing IBM's trademark on its PC and PC/AT systems (and to avoid giving their major competitor, IBM, free advertisement).

IBM designed the 8-bit version as a buffered interface to the motherboard buses of the Intel 8088 (16/8 bit) CPU in the IBM PC and PC/XT, augmented with prioritized interrupts and DMA channels. The 16-bit version was an upgrade for the motherboard buses of the Intel 80286 CPU (and expanded interrupt and DMA facilities) used in the IBM AT, with improved support for bus mastering. The ISA bus was therefore synchronous with the CPU clock until sophisticated buffering methods were implemented by chipsets to interface ISA to much faster CPUs.

ISA was designed to connect peripheral cards to the motherboard and allows for bus mastering. Only the first 16 MB of main memory is addressable. The original 8-bit bus ran from the 4.77 MHz clock of the 8088 CPU in the IBM PC and PC/XT. The original 16-bit bus ran from the CPU clock of the 80286 in IBM PC/AT computers, which was 6 MHz in the first models and 8 MHz in later models. The IBM RT PC also used the 16-bit bus. ISA was also used in some non-IBM-compatible machines such as Motorola 68k-based Apollo (68020) and Amiga 3000 (68030) workstations, the short-lived AT&T Hobbit and the later PowerPC-based BeBox.

Companies like Dell improved the AT bus's performance but in 1987, IBM replaced the AT bus with its proprietary Micro Channel Architecture (MCA). MCA overcame many of the limitations then apparent in ISA but was also an effort by IBM to regain control of the PC architecture and the PC market. MCA was far more advanced than ISA and had many features that would later appear in PCI. However, MCA was also a closed standard whereas IBM had released full specifications and circuit schematics for ISA. Computer manufacturers responded to MCA by developing the Extended Industry Standard Architecture (EISA) and the later VESA Local Bus (VLB). VLB used some electronic parts originally intended for MCA because component manufacturers were already equipped to manufacture them. Both EISA and VLB were backward-compatible expansions of the AT (ISA) bus.

Users of ISA-based machines had to know special information about the hardware they were adding to the system. While a handful of devices were essentially plug-and-play, this was rare. Users frequently had to configure parameters when adding a new device, such as the IRQ line, I/O address, or DMA channel. MCA had done away with this complication and PCI actually incorporated many of the ideas first explored with MCA, though it was more directly descended from EISA.

This trouble with configuration eventually led to the creation of ISA PnP, a plug-and-play system that used a combination of modifications to hardware, the system BIOS, and operating system software to automatically manage resource allocations. In reality, ISA PnP could be troublesome and did not become well-supported until the architecture was in its final days.

A PnP ISA, EISA or VLB device may have a 5-byte EISA ID (3-byte manufacturer ID + 2-byte hex number) to identify the device. For example, CTL0044 corresponds to Creative Sound Blaster 16/32 PnP.

PCI slots were the first physically incompatible expansion ports to directly squeeze ISA off the motherboard. At first, motherboards were largely ISA, including a few PCI slots. By the mid-1990s, the two slot types were roughly balanced, and ISA slots soon were in the minority of consumer systems. Microsoft's PC-99 specification recommended that ISA slots be removed entirely, though the system architecture still required ISA to be present in some vestigial way internally to handle the floppy drive, serial ports, etc., which was why the software-compatible LPC bus was created. ISA slots remained for a few more years and towards the turn of the century it was common to see systems with an Accelerated Graphics Port (AGP) sitting near the central processing unit, an array of PCI slots, and one or two ISA slots near the end. In late 2008, even floppy disk drives and serial ports were disappearing, and the extinction of vestigial ISA (by then the LPC bus) from chipsets was on the horizon.

PCI slots are rotated compared to their ISA counterparts—PCI cards were essentially inserted upside-down, allowing ISA and PCI connectors to squeeze together on the motherboard. Only one of the two connectors can be used in each slot at a time, but this allowed for greater flexibility.

The AT Attachment (ATA) hard disk interface is directly descended from the 16-bit ISA of the PC/AT. ATA has its origins in the IBM Personal Computer Fixed Disk and Diskette Adapter, the standard dual-function floppy disk controller and hard disk controller card for the IBM PC AT; the fixed disk controller on this card implemented the register set and the basic command set which became the basis of the ATA interface (and which differed greatly from the interface of IBM's fixed disk controller card for the PC XT). Direct precursors to ATA were third-party ISA hardcards that integrated a hard disk drive (HDD) and a hard disk controller (HDC) onto one card. This was at best awkward and at worst damaging to the motherboard, as ISA slots were not designed to support such heavy devices as HDDs. The next generation of Integrated Drive Electronics drives moved both the drive and controller to a drive bay and used a ribbon cable and a very simple interface board to connect it to an ISA slot. ATA is basically a standardization of this arrangement plus a uniform command structure for software to interface with the HDC within the drive. ATA has since been separated from the ISA bus and connected directly to the local bus, usually by integration into the chipset, for much higher clock rates and data throughput than ISA could support. ATA has clear characteristics of 16-bit ISA, such as a 16-bit transfer size, signal timing in the PIO modes and the interrupt and DMA mechanisms.

== ISA bus architecture ==

The PC/XT-bus is an eight-bit ISA bus used by Intel 8086 and Intel 8088 systems in the IBM PC and IBM PC XT in the 1980s. Among its 62 pins were demultiplexed and electrically buffered versions of the 8 data and 20 address lines of the 8088 processor, along with power lines, clocks, read/write strobes, interrupt lines, etc. Power lines included −5 V and ±12 V in order to directly support pMOS and enhancement mode nMOS circuits such as dynamic RAMs, among other things. The XT bus architecture uses a single Intel 8259 PIC, giving eight vectorized and prioritized interrupt lines. It has four DMA channels originally provided by the Intel 8237. Three of the DMA channels are brought out to the XT bus expansion slots; of these, 2 are normally already allocated to machine functions (diskette drive and hard disk controller):

DMA channel	Expansion	Standard function
0	No	Dynamic random-access memory refresh
1	Yes	Add-on cards
2	Yes	Floppy disk controller
3	Yes	Hard disk controller

The PC/AT-bus, a 16-bit (or 80286-) version of the PC/XT bus, was introduced with the IBM PC/AT. This bus was officially called I/O Channel by IBM. It extends the XT bus by adding a second shorter edge connector in line with the eight-bit XT bus connector, which is unchanged, retaining compatibility with most 8-bit cards. The second connector adds four additional address lines for a total of 24, and 8 additional data lines for a total of 16. It also adds new interrupt lines connected to a second 8259 PIC (connected to one of the lines of the first) and 4 × 16-bit DMA channels, as well as control lines to select 8- or 16-bit transfers.

The 16-bit AT bus slot originally used two standard edge connector sockets in early IBM PC/AT machines. However, with the popularity of the AT architecture and the 16-bit ISA bus, manufacturers introduced specialized 98-pin connectors that integrated the two sockets into one unit. These can be found in almost every AT-class PC manufactured after the mid-1980s. The ISA slot connector is typically black (distinguishing it from the brown EISA connectors and white PCI connectors).

=== Number of devices ===
Motherboard devices have dedicated IRQs (not present in the slots). 16-bit devices can use either PC-bus or PC/AT-bus IRQs. It is therefore possible to connect up to 6 devices that use one 8-bit IRQ each and up to 5 devices that use one 16-bit IRQ each. At the same time, up to 4 devices may use one 8-bit DMA channel each, while up to 3 devices can use one 16-bit DMA channel each.

=== Varying bus speeds ===
Originally, the bus clock was synchronous with the CPU clock, resulting in varying bus clock frequencies among the many different IBM clones on the market (sometimes as high as 16 or 20 MHz), leading to software or electrical timing problems for certain ISA cards at bus speeds they were not designed for. Later motherboards or integrated chipsets used a separate clock generator, or a clock divider which either fixed the ISA bus frequency at 4, 6, or 8 MHz or allowed the user to adjust the frequency via the BIOS setup. When used at a higher bus frequency, some ISA cards (certain Hercules-compatible video cards, for instance), could show significant performance improvements.

=== 8/16-bit incompatibilities ===
Memory address decoding for the selection of 8- or 16-bit transfer mode was limited to 128 KB sections, leading to problems when mixing 8- and 16-bit cards, as they could not co-exist in the same 128 KB area. This is because the MEMCS16 line is required to be set based on the value of LA17-23 only.

== Past and current use ==
ISA is still used today for specialized industrial purposes. In 2008, IEI Technologies released a modern motherboard for Intel Core 2 Duo processors which, in addition to other special I/O features, is equipped with two ISA slots. It was marketed to industrial and military users who had invested in expensive specialized ISA bus adaptors, which were not available in PCI bus versions.

Similarly, ADEK Industrial Computers released a modern motherboard in early 2013 for Intel Core i3/i5/i7 processors, which contains one (non-DMA) ISA slot. Also, MSI released a modern motherboard with one ISA slot in 2020, for use with Skylake and Kaby Lake Intel processors; per its official specifications, it can be accessed within the 32-bit Windows 7 installation. DFI also released a motherboard featuring two ISA slots, for use with Coffee Lake Intel processors; in this example, due to ISA's historic nature, they can only be accessed within KVM-based virtual machines.

The PC/104 bus, used in industrial and embedded applications, is a derivative of the ISA bus, utilizing the same signal lines with different connectors. The LPC bus has replaced the ISA bus as the connection to the legacy I/O devices on current motherboards; while physically quite different, LPC looks just like ISA to software, so the peculiarities of ISA such as the 16 MiB DMA limit (which corresponds to the full address space of the Intel 80286 CPU used in the original IBM AT) are likely to stick around for a while.

=== ATA ===
As explained in the History section, ISA was the basis for the development of the ATA interface, used for ATA (a.k.a. IDE) hard disks. Physically, ATA is essentially a simple subset of ISA, with 16 data bits, support for exactly one IRQ and one DMA channel, and 3 address bits. To this ISA subset, ATA adds two IDE address select ("chip select") lines (i.e., address decodes, effectively equivalent to address bits) and a few unique signal lines specific to ATA/IDE hard disks (such as the Cable Select/Spindle Sync line) In addition to the physical interface channel, ATA goes beyond and far outside the scope of ISA by also specifying a set of physical device registers to be implemented on every ATA (IDE) drive and a full set of protocols and device commands for controlling fixed disk drives using these registers. The ATA device registers are accessed using the address bits and address select signals in the ATA physical interface channel, and all operations of ATA hard disks are performed using the ATA-specified protocols through the ATA command set. The earliest versions of the ATA standard featured a few simple protocols and a basic command set comparable to the command sets of MFM and RLL controllers (which preceded ATA controllers), but the latest ATA standards have much more complex protocols and instruction sets that include optional commands and protocols providing such advanced optional-use features as sizable hidden system storage areas, password security locking, and programmable geometry translation.

In the mid-1990s, the ATA host controller (usually integrated into the chipset) was moved to PCI form. A further deviation between ISA and ATA is that while the ISA bus remained locked into a single standard clock rate (for backward hardware compatibility), the ATA interface offered many different speed modes, could select among them to match the maximum speed supported by the attached drives, and kept adding faster speeds with later versions of the ATA standard (up to 133 MB/s for ATA-6, the latest.) In most forms, ATA ran much faster than ISA, provided it was connected directly to a local bus (e.g., southbridge-integrated IDE interfaces), faster than the ISA bus.

=== XT-IDE ===
Before the 16-bit ATA/IDE interface, there was an 8-bit XT-IDE (also known as XTA) interface for hard disks. It was not nearly as popular as ATA has become, and XT-IDE hardware is now fairly hard to find. Some XT-IDE adapters were available as 8-bit ISA cards, and XTA sockets were also present on the motherboards of Amstrad's later XT clones as well as a short-lived line of Philips units. The XTA pinout was very similar to ATA, but only eight data lines and two address lines were used, and the physical device registers had completely different meanings. A few hard drives (such as the Seagate ST351A/X) could support either type of interface, selected with a jumper.

Many later AT (and AT successor) motherboards had no integrated hard drive interface but relied on a separate hard drive interface plugged into an ISA/EISA/VLB slot. There were even a few 80486-based units shipped with MFM/RLL interfaces and drives instead of the increasingly common AT-IDE.

Commodore built the XT-IDE-based peripheral hard drive and memory expansion unit A590 for their Amiga 500 and 500+ computers that also supported a SCSI drive. Later models – the A600, A1200, and the Amiga 4000 series – use AT-IDE drives.

=== PCMCIA ===
The PCMCIA specification can be seen as a superset of ATA. The standard for PCMCIA hard disk interfaces, which included PCMCIA flash drives, allows for the mutual configuration of the port and the drive in an ATA mode. As a de facto extension, most PCMCIA flash drives additionally allow for a simple ATA mode that is enabled by pulling a single pin low, so that PCMCIA hardware and firmware are unnecessary to use them as an ATA drive connected to an ATA port. PCMCIA flash drive to ATA adapters are thus simple and inexpensive but are not guaranteed to work with any and every standard PCMCIA flash drive. Further, such adapters cannot be used as generic PCMCIA ports, as the PCMCIA interface is much more complex than ATA.

== Emulation by embedded chips ==
Although most modern computers do not have physical ISA buses, almost all PCs – IA-32, and x86-64 – have ISA buses allocated in physical address space. Some southbridges and some CPUs themselves provide services such as temperature monitoring and voltage readings through ISA buses as ISA devices.

== Standardization ==
IEEE started a standardization of the ISA bus in 1985, called the P996 specification. However, despite books being published on the P996 specification, it never officially progressed past draft status.

== Modern ISA cards ==
There still is an existing user base with old computers, so some ISA cards are still manufactured, e.g. with USB ports or complete single-board computers based on modern processors, USB 3.0, and SATA.

== See also ==
- PC/104 - Embedded variant of ISA
- Low Pin Count (LPC)
- Extended Industry Standard Architecture (EISA)
- Micro Channel architecture (MCA)
- VESA Local Bus (VLB)
- Peripheral Component Interconnect (PCI)
- Accelerated Graphics Port (AGP)
- PCI-X
- PCI Express (PCI-E or PCIe)
- List of computer bus interfaces
- Amiga Zorro II
- NuBus
- Switched fabric
- List of device bandwidths
- CompactPCI
- PC card
- Universal Serial Bus (USB)
- Legacy port
- Backplane
