= Fabrik Inc. =

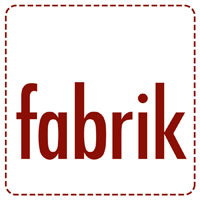
- Company type: Subsidiary of Hitachi
- Founded: 2005
- Headquarters: San Mateo, California, United States
- Key people: Keyur Patel, Chairman; Mike Cordano, CEO
- Industry: External hard disk drive, backup and content management services
- Products: SimpleTech; G-Technology; Joggle; Fabrik Ultimate Backup.
- Employees: 140
- Website: www.fabrik.com

Fabrik Inc. was a manufacturer of external hard drives and digital content management software and services. Fabrik claims it was the third largest supplier of external storage products in North America in 2007. It is headquartered in San Mateo, with offices in Santa Ana and Culver City, California.

The company sells external hard drives and online backup software in a bundled product for consumers, small business users and audio/video (A/V) content creation professionals. The company also hosts the free online digital content management and sharing site, Joggle.

Fabrik's product lines include SimpleTech, G-Technology, Joggle and Fabrik Ultimate Backup.

== History ==
Fabrik was founded as a Smart network-attached storage (NAS) software company in August 2005 by former Maxtor executives Mike Cordano and Keyur Patel. Patel hired a team of 4 led by founding VP of Engineering Robert Free, who designed and built the Maxtor Fusion NAS box that categorized media and supported visual sorting and searches. Free developed new algorithms for optimized visual searches. This was acquired by Seagate and later used as the foundation for creating a web-based myfabrik.com.

Anaal Udaybabu designed a brand identity for on-the-web storage. The following month, the company disclosed the completion of its series A funding of $4.1 million followed by $8 million in series B funding in July 2006 and $14.3 million in February 2007. Then in May 2007, the company received $24.9 million in funding, bringing the total to about $51.3 million in funding.

In February 2006, Fabrik partnered with Maxtor (acquired by Seagate in 2005) to develop Maxtor Fusion, a network-attached storage (NAS) device built for organizing and sharing digital files, and in late 2006 the company launched myfabrik.com, which organized and stored digital media online.

In February 2007, the company acquired the consumer business of SimpleTech, inheriting the SimpleTech product line of external hard drives for consumers and small businesses.

In January 2008, Fabrik acquired G-Technology and inherited a suite of external hard drives for Mac, creative pro, photography and A/V markets, including FireWire eSATA, USB, SCSI and Fibre Channel storage products.

Fabrik's acquisitions and the introduction of Joggle at the DEMO conference in January 2008 created four brands: SimpleTech, G-Technology, Joggle and Fabrik Ultimate Backup. SimpleTech and G-Technology products were still branded as such and maintained separate online website entities.

On February 23, 2009, Hitachi Global Storage Technologies announced it agreed to acquire Fabrik. At this point Fabrik revenue for the year (2009) was estimated at $350M to $400M range and growing 40% on yearly basis.

On April 6, 2009, Hitachi Global Storage Technologies completed the acquisition, which formed the core of Hitachi GST's new Branded Business division.

Following the acquisition, the subsidiary was branded 'G-Technology by Hitachi'.

== Products and services ==
The company's SimpleTech products are external hard drives for mainstream consumers and small business users. It includes portable external hard drives and desktop external hard drives. All SimpleTech products come bundled with free local backup software and online backup capabilities.

The SimpleTech [re]drive has a 100 percent recyclable enclosure and several energy and resource efficiency features. The company claims the [re]drive is the world's most eco-friendly, resource conscious external hard drive. The original design of the SimpleTech portable external storage product line was inspired by the Ferrari design team Pininfarina.

Fabrik started a free online digital content management site called Joggle in early 2008. The Web site searches for video, photos and music on a user's computer, external hard drive or online communities and networking sites and automatically consolidates it into a single online organizing and sharing tool.

The company also has a pure online backup approach, Fabrik Ultimate Backup, where data can be backed up to remote servers using 128-bit SSL and Blowfish encryption.
