= Two-dimensional magnetic recording =

Technology for storing data in hard disk drives

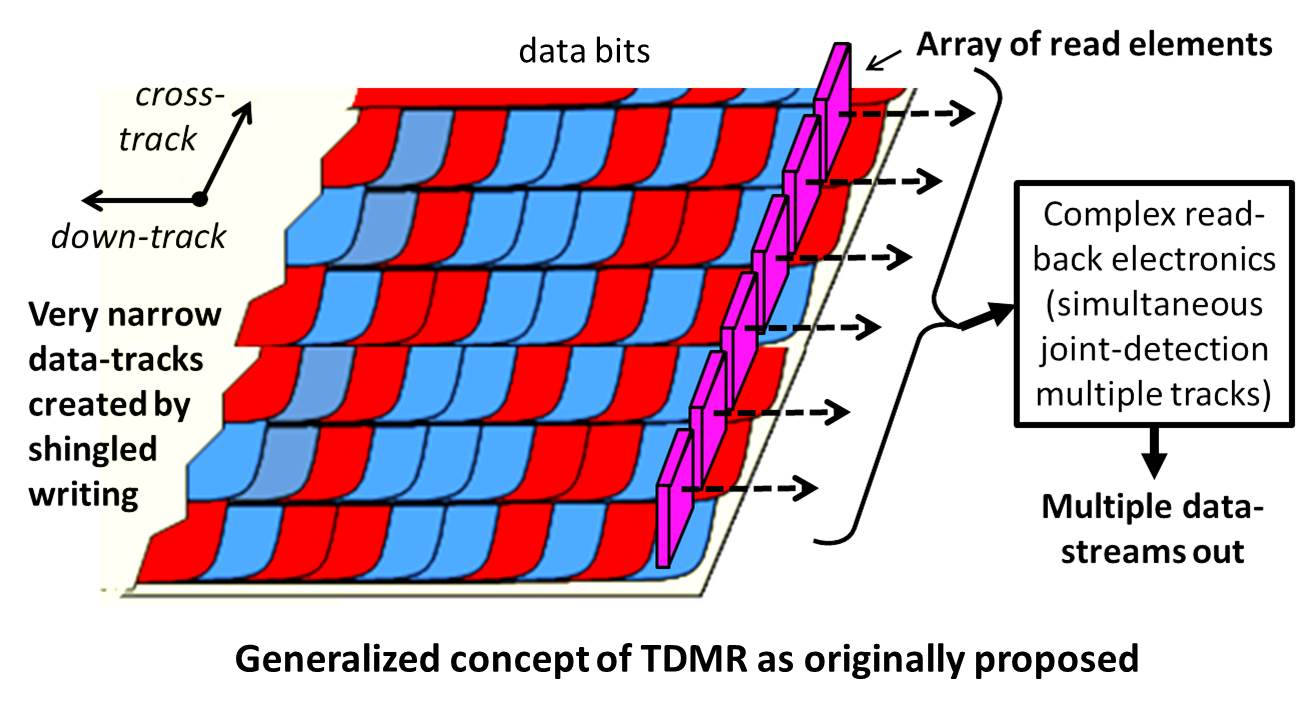
General concept for TDMR using multiple read elements

Two-dimensional magnetic recording (TDMR) is a technology introduced in 2017 in hard disk drives (HDD) used for computer data storage. Most of the world's data is recorded on HDDs, and there is continuous pressure on manufacturers to create greater data storage capacity in a given HDD form-factor and for a given cost. In an HDD, data is stored using magnetic recording on a rotating magnetic disk and is accessed through a write-head and read-head (or read-element). TDMR allows greater storage capacity by advantageously combining signals simultaneously from multiple read-back heads to enhance the recovery of one or more data-tracks. In this manner, data can be stored with higher areal-density on the disks thus providing higher capacity in each HDD. TDMR is a read-back technology and thus applies equally well to future recording (writing) technologies such as heat-assisted magnetic recording (HAMR) and microwave-assisted magnetic recording (MAMR).

== Overview ==
The TDMR approach arose from a working group set up under INSIC to explore alternative future storage technologies. In the initial concept, the data-tracks were assumed to be very narrow tracks created by shingled recording and subject to considerable mutual interference. The read-heads were assumed to be each centered over a corresponding data-track and a joint detector would optimally recover data from several tracks simultaneously. The technique was viewed as akin to partial-response maximum-likelihood (PRML) in providing gains similar to and in addition to the gains from PRML but operating across the tracks rather than down the track. A relatively large body of subsequent work has explored this configuration primarily from the perspective of signal processing. However, the technical challenge of creating an array of closely spaced read-heads and the complexity of jointly detecting data simultaneously on several tracks are both considerable.

== Implementations ==
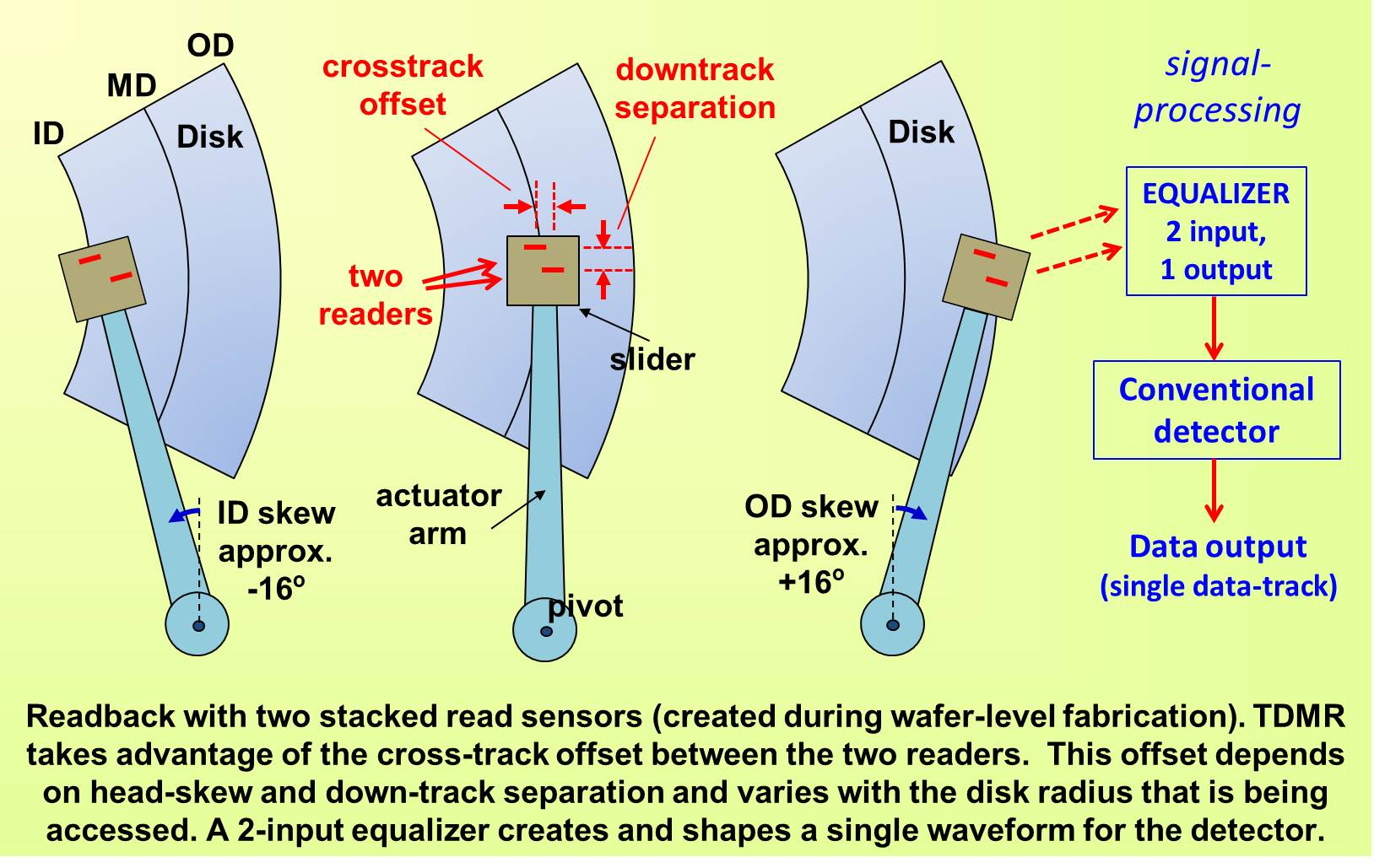
First implementation of TDMR in a product (2017)

In 2017, M. Fatih Erden announced at the TMRC conference that Seagate had been shipping HDDs with TDMR since earlier that year. This was followed by Western Digital in 2018 and Toshiba in 2019. These actual first implementations of TDMR are much simpler and very different from the scenario originally envisioned above. Current implementations recover only a single track using a read head with just two read-elements stacked one above the other (i.e. downtrack) and rely on the skew arising from the use of a rotary actuator to create some cross-track separation between the sensors. This TDMR approach is being applied to both shingled (SMR) and conventional PMR HDDs. The gains achieved are quite modest (6 to 12%) but are expected to increase going forward as more complex schemes are implemented.

In concept, there is little change to the read electronics except that the equalizer that shapes the signal prior to detection now has two inputs and must be appropriately optimized. However, in practice, there is significant added complexity in the read electronics and in the setup process during manufacturing. This complexity is associated with optimization of the equalization (waveform shaping) and timing recovery for the dynamically varying offtrack conditions – further complicated by the cross-track offset between readers that varies with radius.

The HDD servo system also utilizes the position error signals from the two readers. Doing so reduces the repeatable runout, especially when the readers have a wider separation.
