= Michael Mallary =

American data storage engineer, inventor, and author

Michael L. Mallary
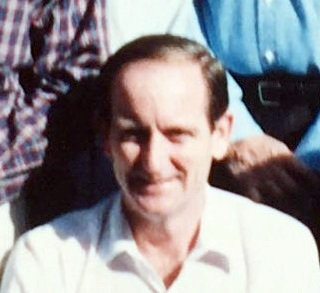
- Michael Mallary, Lake Arrowhead, 1990
- Born: May 6, 1945 (age 81); New Rochelle, New York
- Education: MIT, Caltech
- Occupations: Engineer, Inventor, Author
- Employer(s): DEC, Seagate, Western Digital
- Awards: IEEE Fellow, 2007; IEEE Magnetics Society Distinguished Lecturer, 2009; IEEE Magnetics Society Achievement Award, 2013

Michael L. Mallary is an engineer, physicist, inventor, and author who is noted for his contributions in the areas of magnetic recording and data storage on hard disk drives (HDD). His work has concentrated on developing and optimizing magnetic components to maximize data storage density. In particular, he is responsible to inventing the 'trailing-shield' write head used universally in modern HDDs. Mallary is a Fellow of the Institute of Electrical and Electronics Engineers and recipient of the IEEE Magnetics Society Achievement Award.

== Background and education ==
Michael (Mike) Mallary, born May 6, 1945, was raised in Berkeley, California. His mother was an advertising executive and his father was the sculptor Robert Mallary. He attended schools in Los Angeles, California and New York City. He attended Archbishop Stepinac High School where he built a Jacob's Ladder and a crude electron microscope as science projects.

Mallary received the S.B. degree in physics from the Massachusetts Institute of Technology, Cambridge, in 1966 working under John King. He received his Ph.D. degree from the California Institute of Technology in 1971 writing a thesis on high-energy physics under the direction of Prof Frank J. Sciulli.

From 1972 to 1974, Mallary was a post doctoral fellow at Rutherford Laboratory.

== Career ==
In 1974, Mallary joined the Magnetic Corporation of America in Waltham, Massachusetts, designing large superconducting magnets intended for nuclear fusion, high energy physics, magnetic separation, power generation, etc.

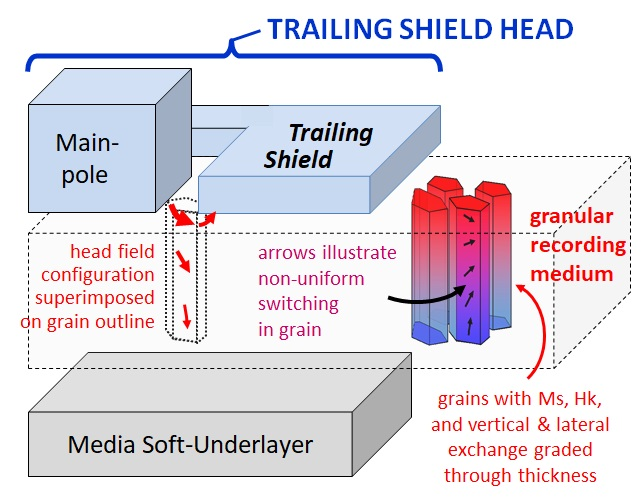
Trailing Shield Concept invented by Mallary. This head design provides higher field gradients and more advantageous field angles for high-density Perpendicular Magnetic Recording. It is ubiquitous in Hard Disk Drives (HDD).

In 1980, Mallary joined Digital Equipment Corporation (DEC) in Shrewsbury, Massachusetts, as a head modeler and designer to support their effort to produce thin film heads for the RA90 disk drive. Bob Rottmayer was the head of the group. At DEC Mallary came up with the idea of the so-called "Diamond Head". This novel approach basically wrapped the yoke around the coil twice - effectively doubling the number of turns. (Maximizing readback voltage is always of paramount importance. This inductive head design was widely deployed, but it was eventually upstaged by the advent of magnetoresistive heads).

From the early 1990s to 2008, Mallary worked for a succession of HDD companies including Rocky Mountain Magnetics, MKE, Quantum, Maxtor, and Seagate working mainly on head design but also on manufacturing aspects such as servowriting. It was during this period that he became involved with the International Storage Industry Consortium (INSIC) on the Extra High Density Recording (EHDR) project working with Mason Williams, Mark Kryder, Dave Thompson and others. The need for continued increases in areal data density led to an intense focus on perpendicular recording which offered the potential of areal-densities up to 1 Terabit per square inch. Earlier at DEC in 1985, Mallary had invented the trailing shield (or shielded-pole) write head for perpendicular recording. This design is able to reach higher recording areal-densities because it provides higher field gradients and more advantageous field angles than a conventional monopole head (see diagram). Perpendicular recording technology is presently used in all hard disk drives and Mallary's trailing-shield head design is ubiquitous.

In 2009, Mallary joined Western Digital in San Jose working on advanced recording technologies including Heat-Assisted Magnetic Recording (HAMR) and Microwave Assisted Magnetic Recording (MAMR).

== Awards and recognition ==
In 2007, Mallary was elevated to IEEE Fellow for "contributions to recording devices".

In 2009, Mallary was selected as a Magnetics Society Distinguished Lecturer and gave presentations worldwide with the title "The Evolution and Revolutions in Disk Drive Recording".

In 2013, Mallary received the IEEE Magnetics Society Achievement Award for "sustained contributions to thin film magnetic recording write head designs; most notably for the invention of the shielded write head structure for perpendicular recording".

In June 2019, Mallary was interviewed by Grant Saviers and Tom Yamashita as part of the Computer History Museum Oral History Series.

== Patents and publications ==
Mallary is an author or coauthor on around 100 U.S. patents. These cover a variety of areas although bulk of them are associated with magnetic write head design for HDDs and, in particular, the invention of the trailing-shield write head for perpendicular recording. Mallary is also the author or coauthor of about 50 technical publications again focussed on magnetic recording for hard disk drives and often in collaboration with academia.

Mallary wrote the chapter that details the operation and design of magnetic recording heads in The Physics of Ultra High Density Magnetic Recording, a book edited by M. Plumer, J. van Ek, and D. Weller published in 2001.

Mallary is the author of a book and a video on cosmology and evolution entitled “Our Improbable Universe: A Physicist Considers How We Got Here” first published in 2004 with a second edition in 2018. The book details how highly tuned (and hence improbable?) are the various constants that determine our physical universe. The book then goes on to examine evolution and society from a similar perspective.

Mallary is an advocate and activist for the use of nuclear power to mitigate the effects of climate change
