= Hard disk drive platter =

Circular disk on which magnetic data is stored in a hard disk drive

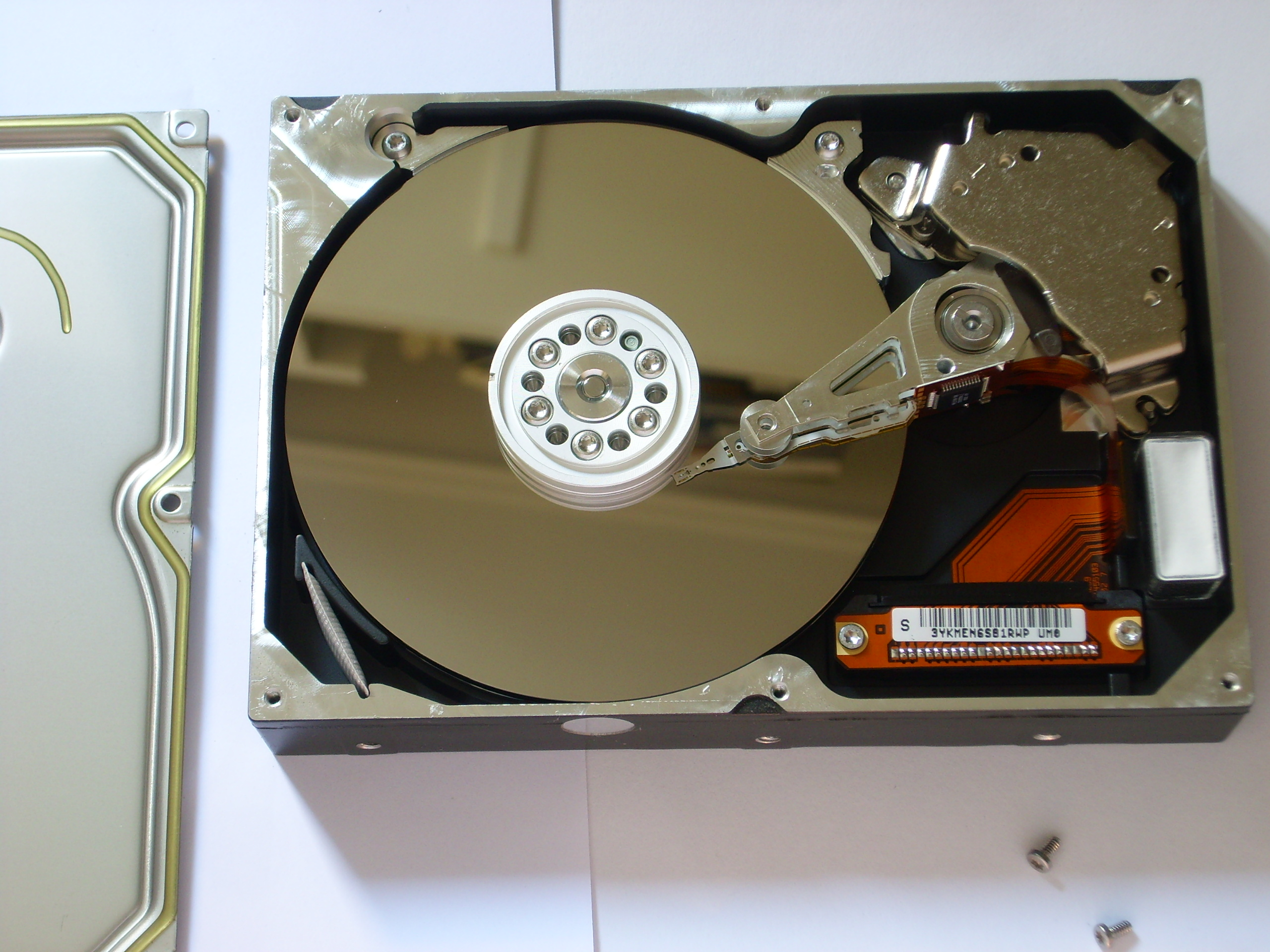
Hard disk platter

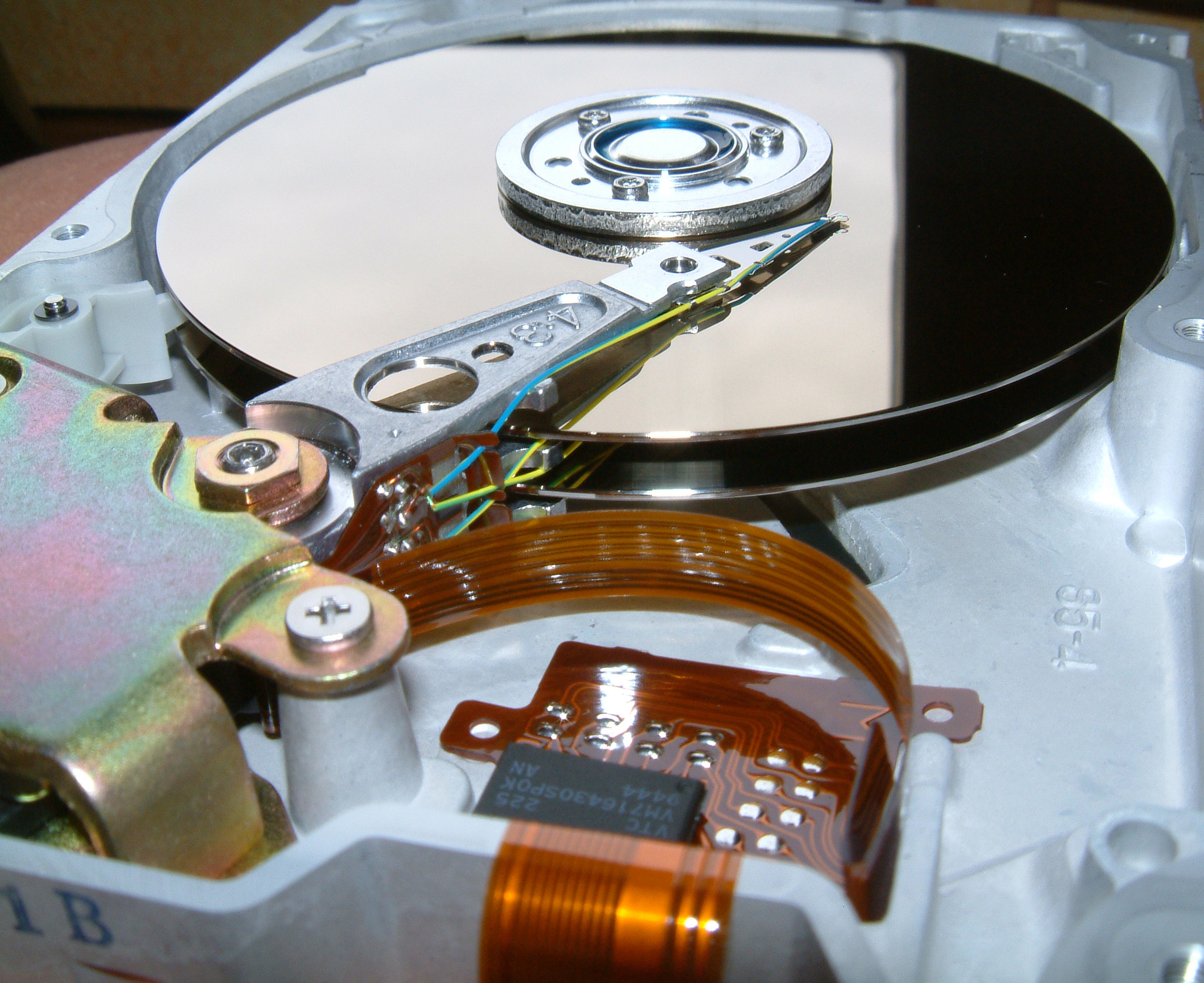
Inside view of a hard disk

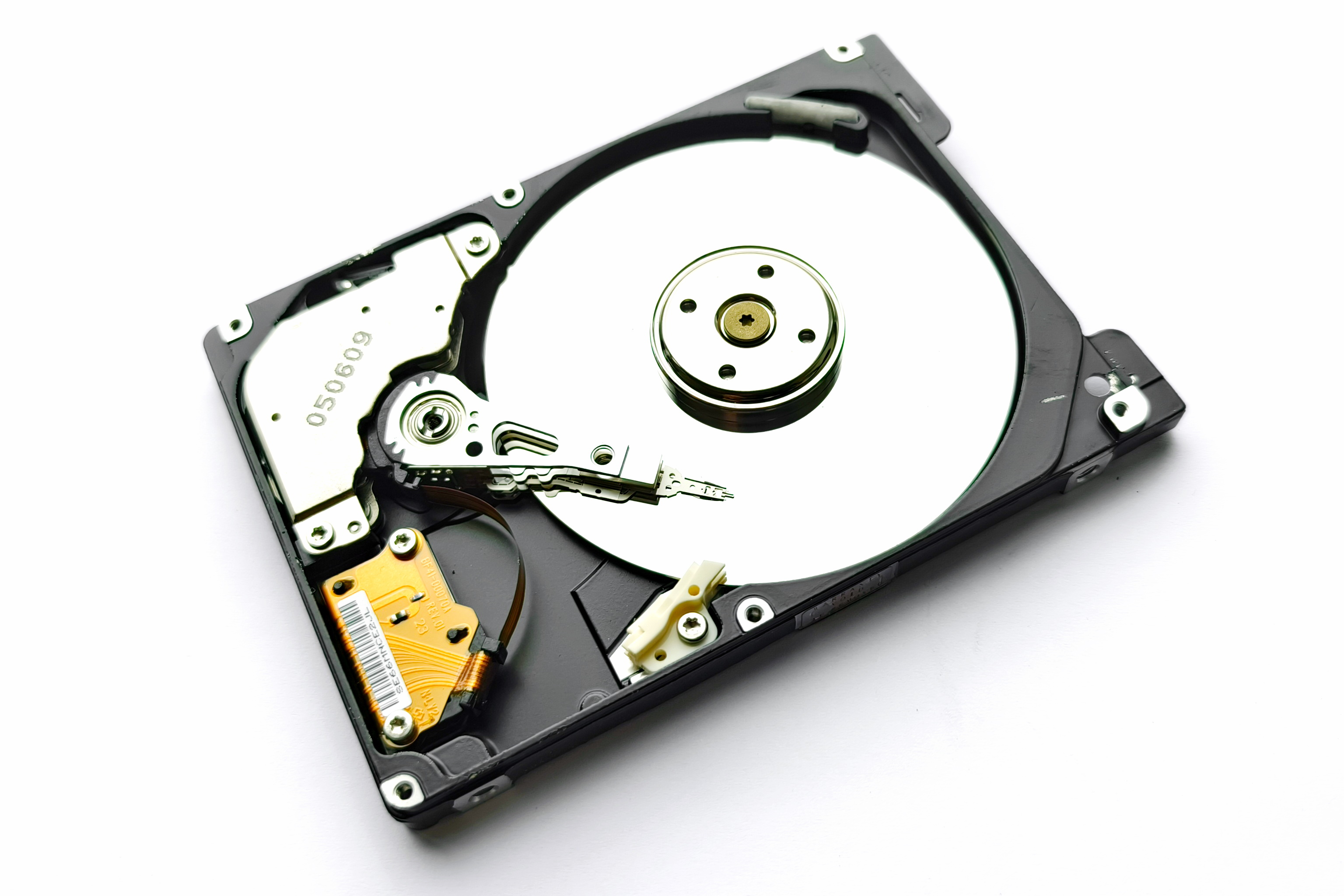
Hard disk drive platter, 2.5" Samsung MP0402H

A hard disk drive platter or hard disk is the circular magnetic disk on which digital data is stored in a hard disk drive. The rigid nature of the platters is what gives them their name (as opposed to the flexible materials which are used to make floppy disks). Hard drives typically have several platters which are mounted on the same spindle. A platter can store information on both sides, typically requiring two recording heads per platter, one per surface. Platters for hard drives are some of the smoothest surfaces currently manufactured. Platters are manufactured, polished, and burnished in cleanrooms, often 100 times cleaner than a hospital operating room, to ensure no contamination. This allows heads to fly at extremely low distances at a few nanometres enabling higher density than in the past.

== Design ==
The magnetic surface of each platter is divided into small sub-micrometer-sized magnetic regions, each of which is used to represent a single bit of information. A typical magnetic region on a hard-disk platter (as of 2006) is about 200–250 nanometers wide (in the radial direction of the platter) and extends about 25–30 nanometers in the down-track direction (the circumferential direction on the platter), corresponding to about 100 billion bits per square inch of disk area (15.5 Gbit/cm^{2}). The material of the main magnetic medium layer is usually a cobalt-based alloy. In today's hard drives each of these magnetic regions is composed of a few hundred magnetic grains, which are the base material that gets magnetized. As a whole, each magnetic region will have a magnetization.

One reason magnetic grains are used as opposed to a continuous magnetic medium is that they reduce the space needed for a magnetic region. In continuous magnetic materials, formations called Néel spikes tend to appear. These are spikes of opposite magnetization, and form for the same reason that bar magnets will tend to align themselves in opposite directions. These cause problems because the spikes cancel each other's magnetic field out, so that at region boundaries, the transition from one magnetization to the other will happen over the length of the Néel spikes. This is called the transition width.

Many hard drive platters have a layer of lubricant made of amorphous carbon such as diamond-like carbon, called an overcoat, which is deposited onto the disk using sputtering, or using chemical vapor deposition. Silicon Nitride, PFPE and hydrogenated carbon have also been used as overcoats. Alternatively PFPE can be used as a lubricant on top of the overcoat.

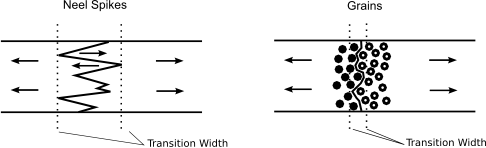
Comparison of the transition width caused by Néel Spikes in continuous media and granular media, at a boundary between two magnetic regions of opposite magnetization

Granular media is oriented based on whether longitudinal or perpendicular magnetic recording is used. Ordered granular media can allow for higher storage densities than conventional granular media, and bit patterned media can succeed ordered granular media in storage density.

Grains help solve this problem because each grain is in theory a single magnetic domain (though not always in practice). This means that the magnetic domains cannot grow or shrink to form spikes, and therefore the transition width will be on the order of the diameter of the grains. Thus, much of the development in hard drives has been in reduction of grain size.

== Manufacture ==
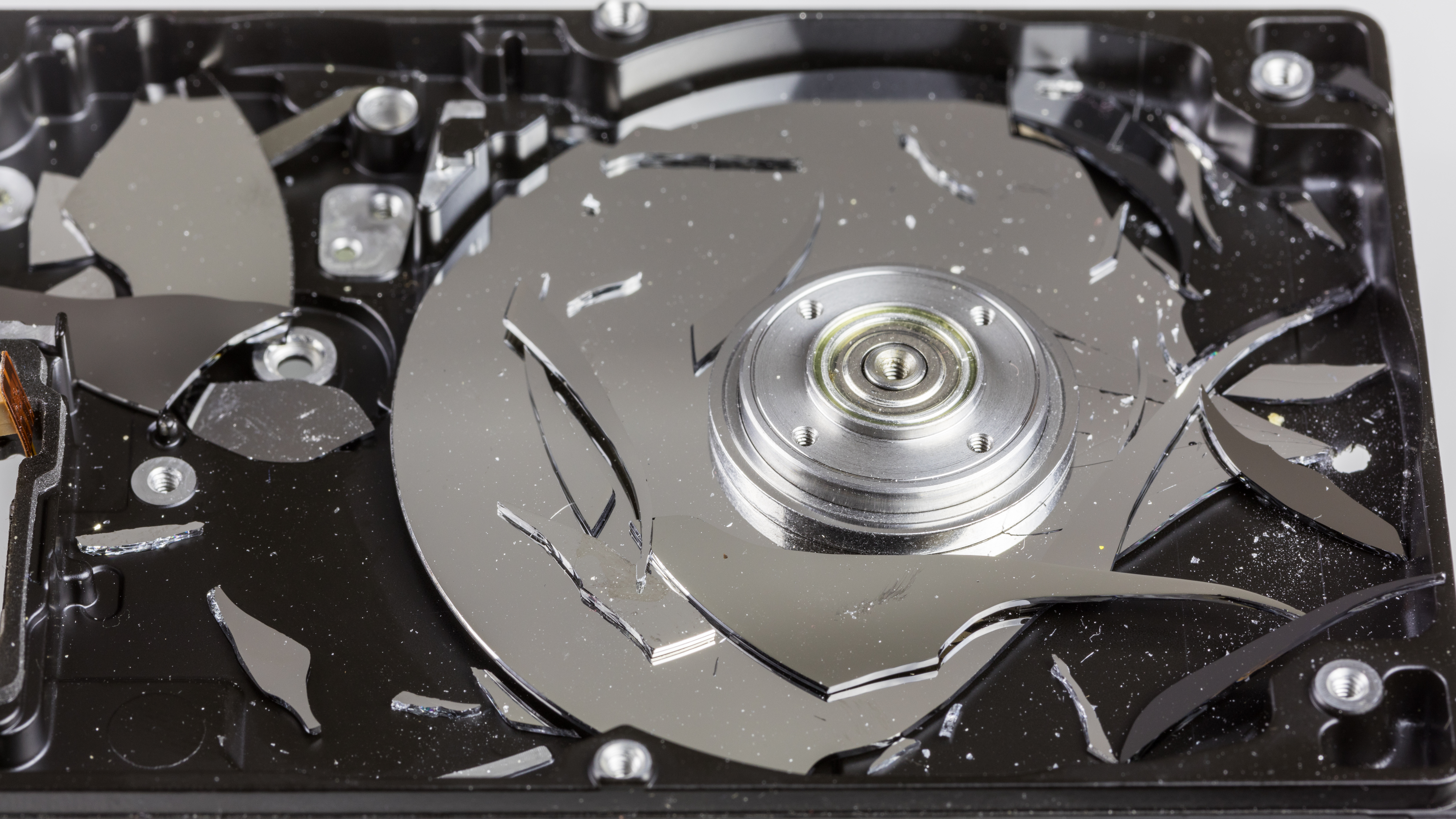
Destroyed hard disk, glass platter visible

Platters are typically made using an aluminium, glass or ceramic substrate. Laptop hard drive platters are made from glass while aluminum platters are often found in desktop computer drives in lower capacities(under 12TB) those using helium filling use very thin glass platters due to limitations of aluminium. In disk manufacturing, a thin coating is deposited on both sides of the substrate, mostly by a vacuum deposition process called magnetron sputtering. The coating has a complex layered structure consisting of various metallic (mostly non-magnetic) alloys as underlayers, optimized for the control of the crystallographic orientation and the grain size of the actual magnetic media layer on top of them, i.e. the film storing the bits of information. On top of it a protective carbon-based overcoat is deposited in the same sputtering process. Platters typically contain several layers of materials such as a seed layer, soft magnetic under layers (SULs) that may contain Cobalt and Iron made of materials such as, an antiferromagnetic (A-FM) layer made of Nickel oxide, Nickel-Manganese or Iron-Manganese alloy, intermediate layer made of Ruthenium and a layer of Cobalt-Chromium-Palladium alloy with oxide. In post-processing a nanometer thin polymeric lubricant layer gets deposited on top of the sputtered structure by dipping the disk into a solvent solution, after which the disk is buffed by various processes to eliminate small defects and verified by a special sensor on a flying head for absence of any remaining asperities or other defects (where the size of the bit given above roughly sets the scale for what constitutes a significant defect size). In the hard-disk drive the hard-drive heads fly and move radially over the surface of the spinning platters to read or write the data. Extreme smoothness, durability, and perfection of finish are required properties of a hard-disk platter.

In 1990, the Toshiba MK1122FC hard drive was released in Japan. It introduced the first platter with glass substrate, replacing the aluminium alloys used in earlier hard drives. In February 1991, Areal Technology released the MD-2060, one of the first hard drives to use a glass substrate. It was originally designed for laptops, for which the greater shock resistance of glass substrates are more suitable. In April 1991, the Toshiba MK1122FC was released in North America; Toshiba's factories were able to produce many more drives than Areal, which soon disappeared from the market. Around 2000, other hard drive manufacturers started transitioning from aluminum to glass platters because glass platters have several advantages over aluminum platters.

In 2005–06, a major shift in technology of hard-disk drives and of magnetic disks/media began. Originally, in-plane magnetized materials were used to store the bits, but this has now been replaced by perpendicular recording. The reason for this transition is the need to continue the trend of increasing storage densities, with perpendicularly oriented media offering a more stable solution for a decreasing bit size. Orienting the magnetization perpendicular to the disk surface has major implications for the disk's deposited structure and the choice of magnetic materials, as well as for some of the other components of the hard-disk drive (such as the head and the electronic channel).

== See also ==
- Data recovery hardware
- Heat-assisted magnetic recording
