= Exchange spring media =

Exchange spring media (also exchange coupled composite media or ECC) is a magnetic storage technology for hard disk drives that allows to increase the storage density in magnetic recording. The idea, proposed in 2004 by Suess et al., is that the recording media consists of exchange coupled soft and hard magnetic layers. Exchange spring media allows a good writability due to the write-assist nature of the soft layer. Hence, hard magnetic layers such as FePt, CoCrPt-alloys or hard magnetic multilayer structures can be written with conventional write heads. Due to the high anisotropy these grains are thermally stable even for small grain sizes. Small grain sizes are required for high density recording. The introduction of the soft layer does not decrease the thermal stability of the entire structure if the hard layer is sufficiently thick. The required thickness of the hard layer for best thermal stability is the exchange length of the hard layer material. The first experimental realization of exchange spring media was done on Co-PdSiO multilayers as the hard layer which was coupled via a PdSi interlayer to a FeSiO soft layer.

Besides the improved writeability, another advantage of exchange spring media is that the switching field distribution of the grains—which has to be as small as possible to allow for high storage densities—can be decreased. This effect was predicted theoretically and experimentally verified on Co/Pd multilayers as hard layer coupled to Co/Ni multilayers as soft layer. In commercial hard disks exchange spring media is used since about 2007.

== See also ==
- Heat-assisted magnetic recording — Another technology to improve the writeability of high coercive materials such as FePt
- Patterned media
- Shingled magnetic recording
