= Mason Lamar Williams =

American engineer, physicist, and inventor in Magnetic Recording (1943-2021)

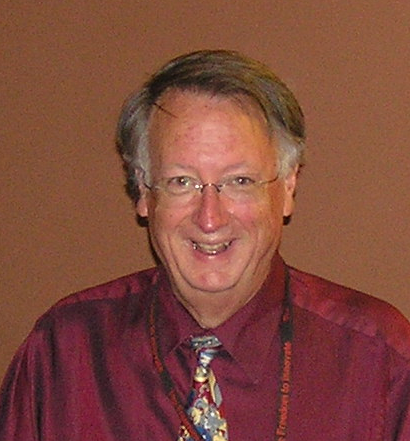
- Mason L. Williams in 2005
- Born: January 20, 1943; San Mateo, California
- Died: June 28, 2021 (aged 78); San Jose, California
- Education: University of Southern California, California Institute of Technology
- Occupations: Engineer, Physicist
- Spouse: Phyllis A. Worthington
- Awards: IEEE Reynold B. Johnson Information Storage Device Technology Award, 2007; IEEE Magnetics Society Distinguished Lecturer 2006; IBM Master Inventor 2001; Fellow Institute of Electrical and Electronics Engineers 1999

Mason Lamar Williams III (January 20, 1943 – June 28, 2021) was an engineer and physicist, noted for his contributions in the areas of magnetic recording and data storage on hard disk drives (HDD). A large part of his career was with the IBM Almaden Research Center in San Jose, California. After retiring, Williams played a major role in the restoration and demonstration of the IBM RAMAC at the Computer History Museum in Mountain View, California

== Background and education ==
Mason Lamar Williams was born in San Mateo, California on 20 January 1943. His parents were Mason Lamar Williams Jr. (1915-1991) and Helen Williams. His father had a long prestigious career in the Army. The family lived in various parts of the US and overseas. Williams graduated from high school in Georgia. He studied engineering at California Institute of Technology, Pasadena and received the B.S. degree in 1964. As a resident of Fleming House in January 1961, he contributed to the Great Rose Bowl Hoax. Williams continued his studies at the University of Southern California, Los Angeles, receiving an M.S.E.E. degree in 1966 and a Ph.D. degree in Electrical Engineering with a minor in Physics in 1970. His advisor at USC was physicist Jan Smit noted for his work on magnetic ferrites.
Williams and his wife, Phyllis (m. 1968/06/22) lived in the Almaden Valley. They had two sons, Michael and Stephen. Williams died in San Jose on June 28, 2021, at the age of 78.

== Career ==
Williams joined IBM, San Jose, CA, in 1970 initially in the Manufacturing Research organization where he reported to Larry Comstock. In the late 70's he worked on magnetic bubble memory. In 1982, he joined the Magnetic Recording Institute (led by Charles Denis Mee) and managed an investigation of perpendicular magnetic recording. In 1985 he moved to the IBM Almaden Research Center to become manager of Advanced Recording Heads with a focus on magnetic modelling.
Williams represented IBM on the National Storage Industry Consortium (INSIC) UltraHigh Density Magnetic Recording Head project. In 1996, he became a member of the Extremely High Density Recording Strategy Team at INSIC which led to the proposal for TDMR technology.
In 2002, the IBM HDD division was purchased by Hitachi. Williams worked for Hitachi Global Storage Technologies (HGST) and continued to conduct fundamental research and modeling of magnetic recording physics and on HDD system integration.
After Williams retired from Hitachi GST in 2005, he played a major role in the restoration of the IBM RAMAC, the first commercial hard disk drive. This work was done at the Computer History Museum in Mountain View, California. He volunteered as a docent at the museum and gave weekly demonstrations of the drive.

== Awards and recognition ==
In 1999, Williams was elevated to the grade of IEEE Fellow for "contributions to the understanding of the digital magnetic recording process and the continued progress of areal density of disk drives".
In 2006 Williams was selected as a Distinguished Lecturer for the IEEE Magnetics Society. He gave a presentation entitled "Beyond the Limits of Magnetic Recording: An Itinerant Magnetician Looks at Hysterical Loops" at multiple locations throughout Europe, Asia, and America.
In 2006, Williams also received the Reynold B Johnson Data Storage Device Technology Award for "significant advances in storage device technology engineering, research, leadership, or education; leading to the development of commercial data storage devices"
Williams was a prolific inventor and authored or coauthored 27 US Patents. Several of the patents are highly cited, notably on magnetoresistive read heads, Shingled Recording and perpendicular recording. Williams was recognized as an IBM Master Inventor in 2001
Williams was the author of numerous technical papers on magnetic recording and was particularly noted for his early collaboration with Larry Comstock that resulted in the eponymous Williams-Comstock model that allowed the optimization of the written transitions that carry data in magnetic recording
