= Bit cell =

A bit cell is the length of tape, the area of disc surface, or the part of an integrated circuit in which a single bit is recorded. The smaller the bit cells are, the greater the storage density of the medium is.

In magnetic storage, the magnetic flux or magnetization does not necessarily change at the boundaries of bit cells to indicate bit states. For example, the presence of a magnetic transition within a bit cell might record state 1, and the lack of such a transition might record state 0. Other encodings are also possible.

== See also ==
- Computer data storage
