= Areal Technology =

American hard disk drive manufacturer (1987–1999)

Areal Technology, Inc.
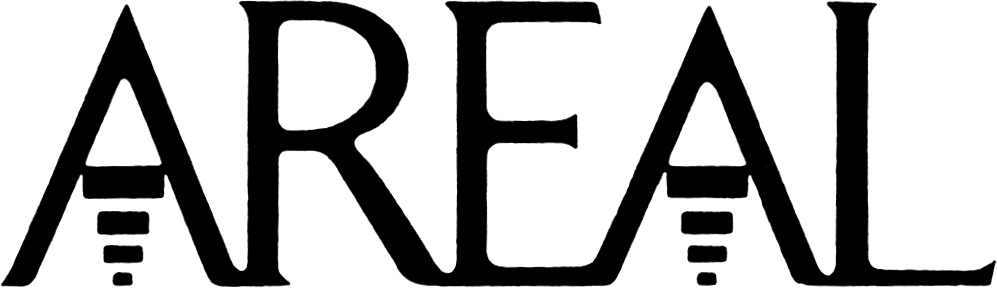
- Type: Private
- Industry: Computers
- Founded: 1987; 39 years ago in Santa Clara, California, United States
- Founder: Jack Swartz
- Defunct: 1999; 27 years ago
- Fate: Dissolution
- Products: Hard disk drives
- Number of employees: 105 (1991, peak)
- Parent: Tomen Electronics and Sanyo (1993–1999)
- Website: areal.com at the Wayback Machine (archived 1997-06-27)

Areal Technology, Inc., was an American hard disk drive manufacturer active from 1987 to 1999. The company was one of the first to produce hard drives employing glass as the substrate for their platters, allowing for significantly higher data densities and greater shock resistance. In 1993, Areal was sold to Tomen Electronics and Sanyo, who operated the company as a joint venture. Areal continued as a subsidiary until 1999.

== History ==
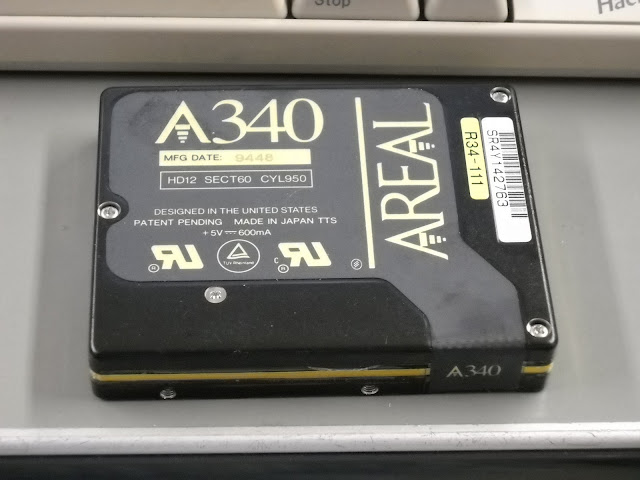
Areal A340, 2.5-inch, 340-MB hard drive, manufactured in late 1994

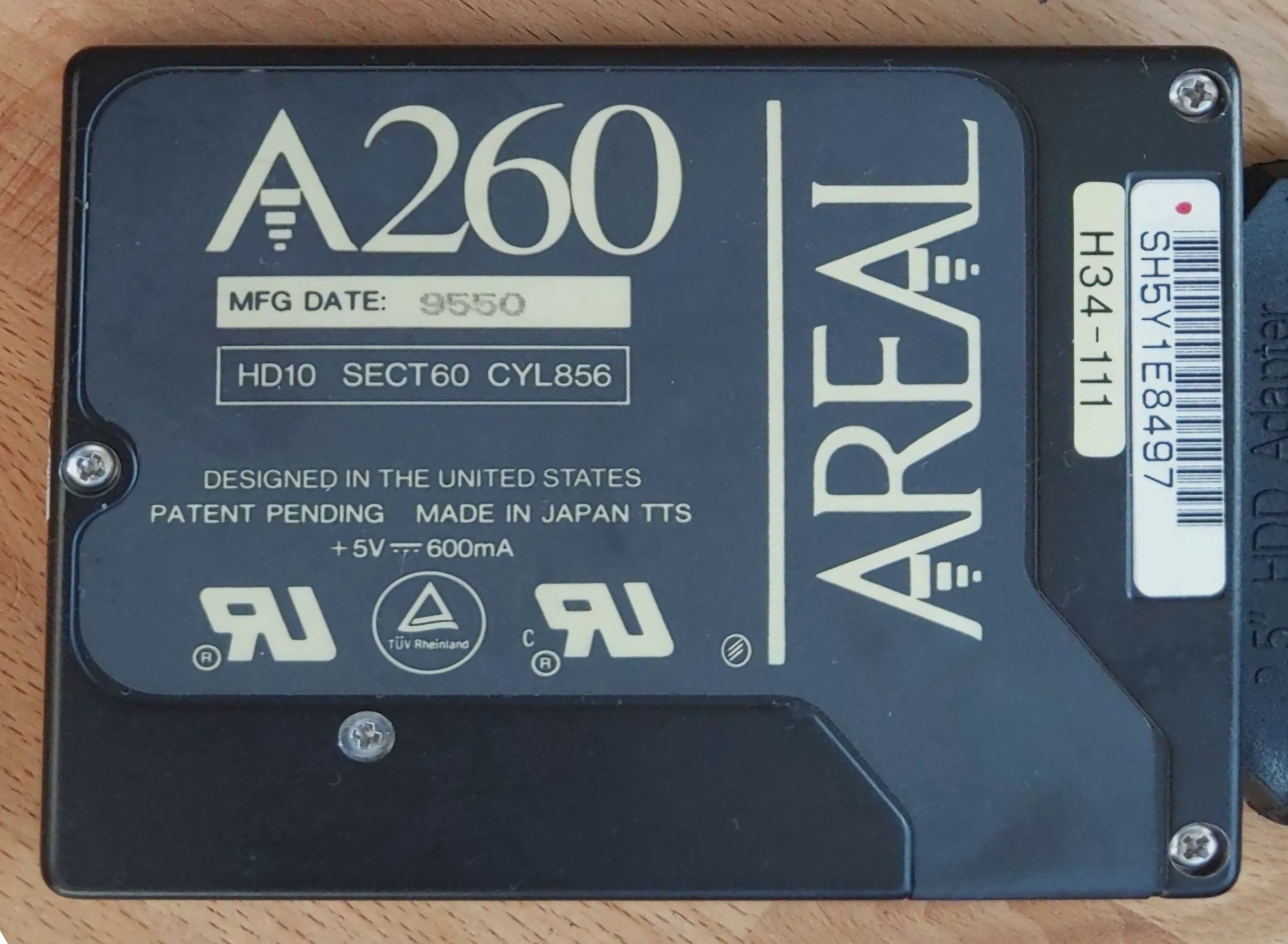
Areal A260, 2.5-inch, 260-MB hard drive, manufactured in late 1995

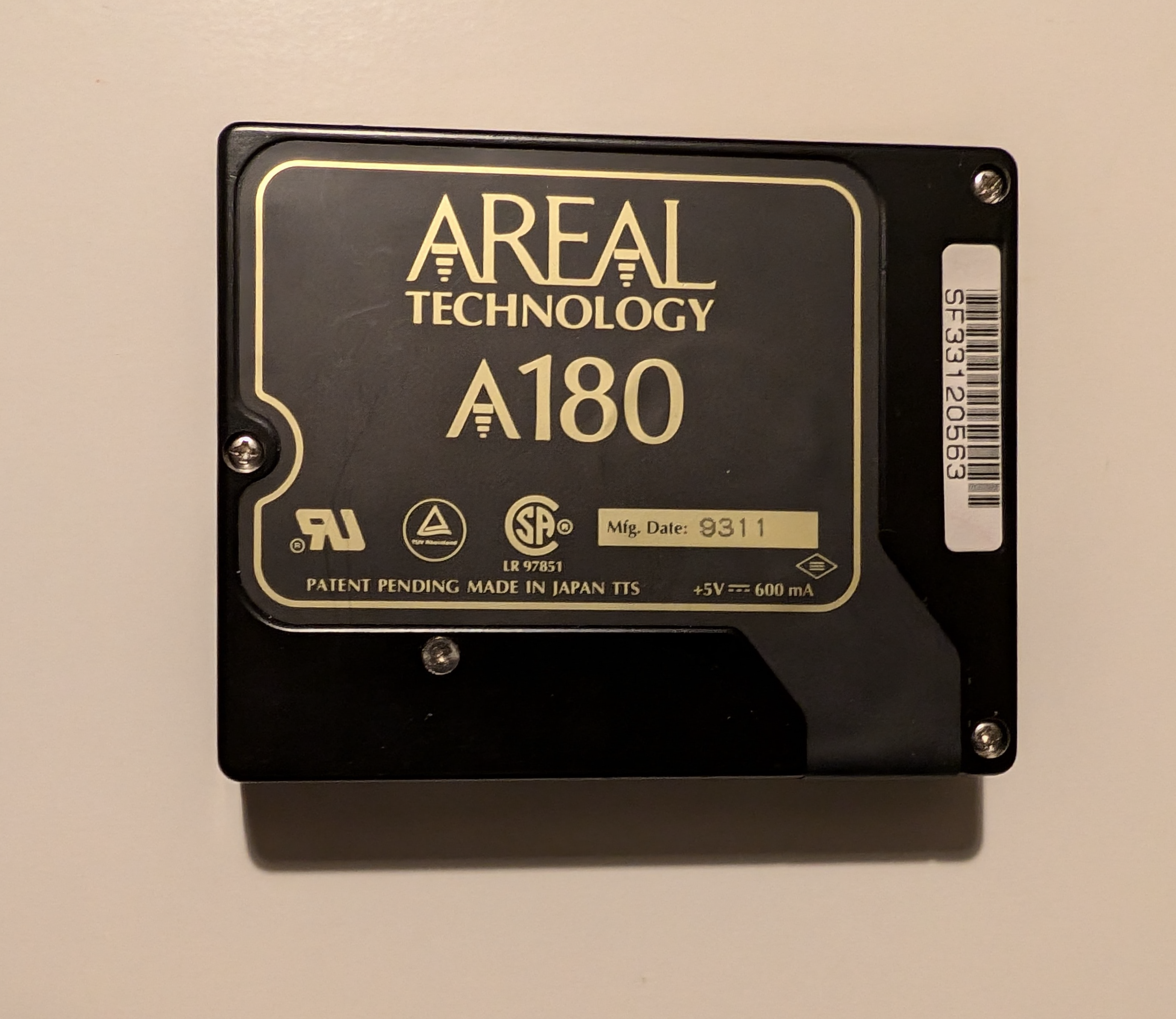
Areal A180, 2.5-inch, 180-MB hard drive, manufactured in late 1993

=== Foundation (1987–1988) ===
Areal Technology was founded by Jack Swartz in late 1987. Swartz had previously co-founded Maxtor Corporation, one of the largest hard drive manufacturers in the world, in 1982, before leaving them in mid-1987 amid an executive shakeup at the company. Several other veterans of the hard drive industry, including top executives from Maxtor, soon followed Swartz to Areal. Arena set up its original headquarters in Santa Clara, California. In March 1988, the company set up a research and development office in Tucson, Arizona. In fall 1988, the company opened up its first production facility in Point Arena, California, within a 10,000-square-foot building formerly occupied by the Arena Bowl bowling alley.

Areal's first products were announced in October 1988. They consisted of the BP-50 and the BP-100, 3.5-inch-diameter hard disk drives storing 50 MB and 100 MB of data, respectively. These were the first announced hard drives employing specialized ultra-flat glass as the substrate for their platters. The use of glass allows for much higher data densities and greater shock resistance than those of disks using aluminum as the substrate, which was the industry standard at the time. Areal's main supplier of glass was Hoya Optics, a U.S.-based subsidiary of the Japanese Hoya Corporation which had recently opened a glass factory in the United States for worldwide production. Areal was additionally the first company to build major internal components of its drives using polycarbonate plastic in order to save weight, as its targeted clientele were portable makers. These parts included the actuator arm, the top cover, and the base plate. GE Plastics developed a special blend of their Lexan resin specifically for Areal.

=== Japanese investors and ouster (1988–1990) ===
In December 1988, Areal received a multi-million-dollar capital injection from Nippon Sheet Glass (NSG) and Tokyo Boeki. The two companies received a minority stake in the Areal as a result of their capital infusion. The following April, Areal leased 35,000-square-foot of office space for another research and development facility. The company employed 42 people total in November 1989. Between the end of 1988 and the middle of 1990, Areal had received roughly $7.5 million in funding from their Japanese investors, which now also included Toyo Menka Kaisha and Tomen Electronics. Areal ended their relationship with Hoya in the middle of 1990, switching to NSG as a glass supplier.

Despite the capital investment and multiple hiring rounds at the company's Point Arena plant, Areal's 3.5-inch hard drive products were met with multiple delays owing to recurring bugs in the designs of the drives' logic board; and difficulty in bringing the cost of manufacturing down by reducing the number of assembly steps. In addition, Areal's Japanese investors pressured the company into entering the nascent market for 2.5-inch-diameter drives, to the chagrin of Kirby, who saw the most potential returns in the well-established 3.5-inch-diameter drive market. Areal relented to the Japanese investors' demands and announced the MicroDrive (MD) line of 2.5-inch glass hard drives in fall 1989, with a trio of drives measuring between 49 MB and 100 MB. Meanwhile, the delays in the 3.5-inch product led to deadlines being missed for all of their contracts with computer systems manufacturers to provide the latter with production samples and preparatory design materials. A clash between the Japanese investors and Swartz over the direction of the company led to the latter's ouster in July 1990. Swartz's CEO position was filled by Mike Kirby, while Steve Drexler (an early Areal employee) succeeded Swartz as chairman. Kirby terminated all further work on 3.5-inch drives, in favor of developing 2.5-inch drives. By this point, the company had only 25 employees.

=== Market introduction (1990–1991) ===
In November 1990, Sanyo announced as part of separate agreements that they had given Areal $7 million in equity infusion and inked a deal to with Areal produce to produce their MD-2000 series of disk drives in volume quantities. The first product in the line, the MD-2060, was capable of storing 60 MB on a single glass platter, with two read heads for each side of the platter. It was introduced in late November 1990 in evaluation quantities, these samples manufactured by Areal's employees in Point Area. Areal by December 1990 had 60 employees total.

Sanyo began producing the MD-2060 in volume quantities in early 1991, after Areal had received their first large contract from Disk Technologies Corporation of Florida worth $4 million in December 1990. The MD-2060 was one of the first hard drives made with glass platters available on the mass market. Toshiba, another pioneer in the glass platter space, outfitted their own laptops with Areal's drives in the same year, due to their higher capacity. Areal reached peak employment of 105 workers in February 1991.

=== Expansion (1991–1993) ===
In October 1991, Areal introduced their flagship A-Series 2.5-inch drives with the A180 and the A120. The A180 was the highest-capacity 2.5-inch drive to that date, with 180 MB of capacity across two platters. In 1991, Areal signed on Wearnes Technology of Singapore as a second source of their hard drives.

Areal branched out from the OEM market in May 1992 and began selling to customers directly with the E-Series of external drives. Drives in the E-Series plugged directly to a computer's parallel port, with a passthrough port on the rear to allow other parallel-port devices such as printers to work with the system in tandem. In November 1992, they announced the AA9180 disk array, composed of nine 2.5-inch, 180-MB hard drives occupying the footprint of one 5.25-inch server drive bay, for a total of 1.2 GB of storage. Areal built the AA9180 with a logic board allowing for different RAID configurations, including RAID 5.

=== Acquisition and decline (1993–1999) ===
In 1992, Areal achieved sales of nearly US$44 million, with roughly 150,000 drives shipped that year. In January 1993, Tomen and Sanyo acquired a majority stake in Areal for $3 million, effectively buying out the company and placing it under Japanese control. Areal continued as a subsidiary under their joint venture, with employment number dwindling to just under 100 workers by June 1993.

Areal produced their last hard drives in 1995. The company's apex was the A1080, a 2.5-inch drive with a 1.08 GB capacity. Areal operated as a holding company into 1997, with Mitsuhiro Naoe serving as the company's chairman. In March 1999, however, Areal filed its certificate of dissolution, ending the company for good.

== See also ==
- Areal density (computer storage)
