= Shun-ichi Iwasaki =

Japanese engineer (1926–2025)

- 岩崎 俊一
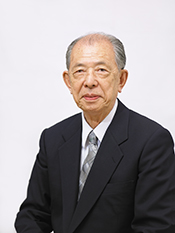
- Iwasaki in 2013
- Born: 3 August 1926; Koriyama, Japan
- Died: 25 July 2025 (aged 98); Sendai, Japan
- Education: Tohoku University
- Known for: Perpendicular Magnetic Recording
- Awards: IEEE Cledo Brunetti Award (1989) Japan Prize (2010) Order of Culture 文化勲章 2013; Benjamin Franklin Medal (2014)
- Scientific career
- Fields: Electrical engineering
- Institutions: Tokyo Tsushin Kogyo; Tohoku University; Tohoku Institute of Technology
- Notable students: Yoshihisa Nakamura, Kazuhiro Ouchi, Hiroaki Muraoka

Shun-ichi Iwasaki (岩崎 俊一, Iwasaki Shun’ichi; 3 August 1926 – 25 July 2025) was a Japanese engineer. He was professor at Tohoku University and then became president and of Tohoku Institute of Technology. He was also a professor at Lanzhou University (China). Iwasaki's pioneering work on perpendicular magnetic recording has been integral to the development of modern hard disk drives.

== Background ==
Shun-ichi Iwasaki was born on 3 August 1926 in Fukushima prefecture, Japan. When the family moved, he attended Akita Junior High School. In 1946, he became a student in the Faculty of Engineering at Tohoku University (東北大学, Tohoku Daigaku) and received a B.A. degree in communications engineering in 1949. He then joined the Tokyo Telecommunications Engineering Corporation (renamed Sony Corporation in 1958), where he was a member of the tape recorder development team. He rejoined Tohoku University in 1951 and, in 1959, received a D. Eng. degree supervised by Kenzo Nagai working on audio recording on magnetic tape.

Iwasaki was married with two children. He retired from academic life and resided in Sendai. Iwasaki died from pneumonia at a Sendai hospital on 25 July 2025, at the age of 98.

== Academic career ==
Iwasaki's early research on ac bias recording was instrumental in the development of "high energy" metal particle tape used, for example, in "Hi8" video cassettes. In 1958, Iwasaki became an assistant professor and in June 1964 he became a full professor at Tohoku University. In 1983 he became vice president of the Magnetics Society of Japan. From April 1986, he then was head of the Research Institute of Electrical Communication at Tōhoku University and became a member of the University Council. He was retired from Lanzhou University in 1988, and from Tōhoku University in April 1989, but at the same time became President of the Tohoku Institute of Technology. In May of the same year he also became president of the Magnetics Society of Japan. In May 1991 he became a member of the council of the Institute of Space and Astronautical Science. Furthermore, from 1991 to 2000 Iwasaki was a member of the Science Council of Japan (日本学術会議, Nihon-gakujutsu-kaigi. In 2003 he became a member of the Japan Academy (日本学士院, Nihon-gakushi-in), Section II Fifth subsection (Engineering).

In 1976, Iwasaki and co-workers created a magnetic recording system with a pole head and a CoCr medium backed with a soft magnetic underlayer. The CoCr medium was designed with a strong anisotropy aligned *perpendicular* to the tape surface rather than in-plane. This approach was able to extend magnetic recording to much higher data storage densities. After its introduction in 2005, perpendicular recording was quickly adopted as the preferred data storage approach for all Hard Disk Drives. These devices provide the vast bulk of the on-line storage for the internet and cloud computing. Perpendicular Recording is proposed as an IEEE engineering milestone.

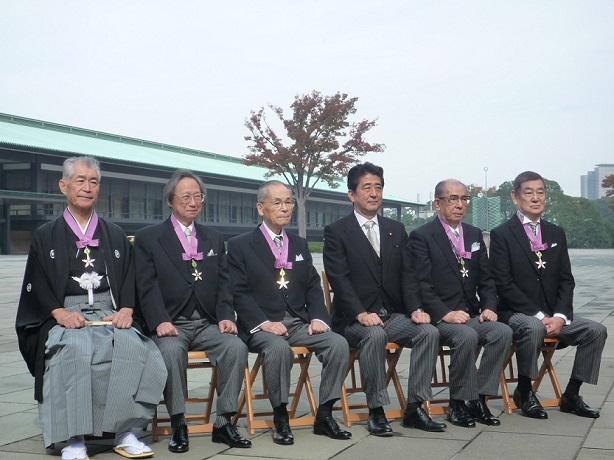
Award of Order of Culture (文化勲章, Bunka-kunshō) 3rd Nov. 2013. left to right: Tasuku Honjo, Susumu Nakanishi, Ikuta Takagi, Prime Minister Shinzō Abe, Shun-ichi Iwasaki, and Ken Takakura

== Major honors and awards ==
Iwasaki won national and international recognition as a result of the pioneering work on perpendicular recording:

- Japan Academy Prize (1987)
- Persons of Cultural Merit (1987)
- IEEE Edward J. McCluskey Technical Achievement Award (1987)
- IEEE Cledo Brunetti Award "For contributions to the miniaturization of magnetic recording systems"(1989).
- Achievement Award of the Magnetics Society of Japan (2002)
- Order of the Sacred Treasure, Gold and Silver Star (2003)
- Japan Prize for "Contributions to high-density magnetic recording technology by the development of a perpendicular magnetic recording method", (日本国際賞, Nihon-kokusai-sho) (2010)
- Order of Culture (文化勲章, Bunka-kunshō) 3rd Nov. 2013 (see photo)
- Benjamin Franklin Medal (with Mark H. Kryder), "for the development and realization of the system of Perpendicular Magnetic Recording, which has enabled a dramatic increase in the storage capacity of computer-readable media."(2014)

In 1992, Iwasaki was the IEEE Magnetics Society Distinguished Lecturer with the topic "Evolution and Future of Perpendicular Magnetic Recording".

Iwasaki was the subject of oral history interviews by the Computer History Museum in 2016 and by the IEEE Magnetics Society in 2022.

Iwasaki was an honorary member of the IEICE and the Magnetics Society of Japan, and a Life Fellow of the IEEE.
