= Applied Magnetics Corporation =

Defunct American manufacturer

- Founded: 1957
- Defunct: 2000
- Website: appmag.com at the Wayback Machine (archived 1998-01-29)

Applied Magnetics Corporation (AMC) was a magnetic heads manufacturer from 1957 to 2000. Its products were used in magnetic tape and computer disks.

== Founder ==
The company was founded by Harold Frank in 1957 in Goleta, California.

Frank served in WWII as a radio operator and Morse code specialist. After the war, he earned a Bachelor of Science degree in electrical engineering from Washington State University in 1948. After graduation, Frank began work with a seismic crew at Conoco in Wyoming, Oklahoma, and Texas where he helped develop a magnetic tape recording process to assist with geophysical exploration and the identification of oil deposits.

Based on his interest in and experience with magnetic recording, he founded Applied Magnetics Corporation in 1957 in a spare bedroom of his house in Goleta.

== Company history ==
Originally, AMC was a one-man company with Frank serving as administrator, engineer, salesman, and shop worker.

AMC's first government contract came when the company had only seven employees; good performance led to the award of a US Air Force contract in 1961 to produce specialized magnetic recording systems.

By 1968, the company had 850 employees and 17 divisions.

AMC recording heads were used on NASA crewed and uncrewed space flights. AMC magnetic heads were aboard Mariner spacecraft for photographic fly-bys of Mars; photos were recorded digitally and in analog for reproduction and transmission to Earth for electronic processing at the Jet Propulsion Laboratory. On Mercury and Gemini missions, and continuing through Apollo 11, AMC's were the only magnetic recording heads to qualify against crucial NASA standards for operation in the unique space environment. The equipment recorded flight temperatures, pressures, vibration, acceleration, communications, and numerous other critical functions, all of which were transmitted back to Mission Control in Houston, TX. In 1969, NASA presented an award to AMC's research director in recognition of the company's contribution to the advancement of magnetic recording technology.

AMC's stock began trading publicly on the New York Stock Exchange in July 1971, by which time the company had manufacturing facilities in the US, Korea, Belgium, Portugal, Barbados, and Puerto Rico, with its primary product line being magnetic heads to capture information on magnetic tape and disks. AMC eventually expanded to 21 divisions in 12 countries and employed 14,000 people. AMC was a major employer in Santa Barbara County, California, second only to the University of California, Santa Barbara.

Via acquisitions, AMC branched out into other computer components and equipment, such as magnetic core memory and printed circuit boards. In 1971, the company began marketing disk storage for small computers to provide a low-cost fast-access extension to computer memory.

Following a significant downturn in the computer drive industry in the late 1990s, AMC filed for Chapter 11 bankruptcy protection in January 2000. Until then, AMC was the oldest independent US-based supplier of disk read-and-write heads.

Through the Chapter 11 process, AMC was restructured and repositioned into the field of microelectromechanical systems (MEMS), exiting the process in 2001 as Innovative Micro Technology (IMT). Dr. John S. Foster, AMC's former COO, became IMT's first CEO.
