= Patterned media =

Potential hard disk technology

Patterned media (also known as bit-patterned media or BPM) is a potential future hard disk drive technology to record data in magnetic islands (one bit per island), as opposed to current hard disk drive technology where each bit is stored in 20–30 magnetic grains within a continuous magnetic film. The islands would be patterned from a precursor magnetic film using nanolithography. It is one of the proposed technologies to succeed perpendicular recording due to the greater storage densities it would enable. BPM was introduced by Toshiba in 2010.

== Comparison with existing HDD technology ==
In existing hard disk drives, data is stored in a thin magnetic film. This film is deposited so that it consists of isolated (weakly exchange coupled) grains of material of around 8 nm diameter. One bit of data consists of around 20–30 grains that are magnetized in the same direction (either "up" or "down", with respect to the plane of the disk). One method of increasing storage density has been to reduce the average grain volume. However, the energy barrier for thermal switching is proportional to the grain volume. With existing materials, further reductions in the grain volume would result in data loss occurring spontaneously due to superparamagnetism.

In patterned media, the thin magnetic film is first deposited so there is strong exchange coupling between the grains. Using nanolithography, it is then patterned into magnetic islands. The strong exchange coupling means that the energy barrier is now proportional to the island volume, rather than the volume of individual grains within the island. Therefore, storage density increases can be achieved by patterning islands of increasingly small diameter, whilst maintaining thermal stability. Patterned media is predicted to enable areal densities up to 20–300 Tbit/in^{2} (3.1–46.5 Tbit/cm^{2}) as opposed to the 1 Tbit/in^{2} (160 Gbit/cm^{2}) limit that exists with current HDD technology.

=== Differences in read/write head control strategies ===
In existing HDDs data bits are ideally written on concentric circular tracks. This process is different in bit patterned media recording where data should be written on tracks with predetermined shapes, which are created by lithography (see below) on the disk. The trajectories that are required to be followed by the servo system in patterned media recording are characterized by a set of "servo tracks" existing on the disk. Deviation of a servo track from an ideal circular shape is called "repeatable runout" (RRO). Therefore, the servo controller in bit patterned media recording has to follow the RRO which is unknown in the time of design, and as a result the servo control methodologies used for conventional drives cannot be applied. Patterned media recording has some specific challenges in terms of servo control design:

- RRO profile is unknown.
- RRO frequency spectrum can spread beyond the bandwidth of the servo system; therefore, it will be amplified by the feedback controller.
- RRO spectrum contains many harmonics of the spindle frequency (e.g. ~ 200 harmonics) that should be attenuated. This increases the computational burden in the controller.
- RRO profile is changing from track to track (i.e. it is varying).

== Methods of patterned media fabrication ==
=== Ion beam lithography ===
In preliminary research, one of the processes investigated for creating prototypes was ion beam proximity lithography. This uses stencil masks to produce patterns an ion-sensitive material (resist), which are then transferred to magnetic material. The stencil mask contains a thin free-standing silicon nitride membrane in which openings are formed. The pattern to be generated is first formed on a substrate that contains a photo-resist using electron beam lithography. Next the substrate is used to transfer the given pattern onto the nitride membrane (stencil mask) using the process of plasma etching. To create sufficient substrates is to maintain size uniformity of the openings which is transferred to the mask during the fabrication process (etching). Many factors contribute to the achievement and maintenance of size uniformity in the mask, such as: pressure, temperature, energy (amount of voltage), and power used when etching. To optimize the process of etching uniform patterns correctly under these parameters, the substrate can be used as a template to fabricate stencil masks of silicon nitride through the process of ion proximity beam lithography. The stencil mask can then be used as a prototype to create pattern media.

=== Directed self-assembly of block copolymer films ===
In 2014, Ricardo Ruiz of Hitachi Global Storage Technologies writes in an upcoming-conference briefing note that "the most promising solution to the lithographic challenge can be found in directed self-assembly of block copolymer films which has recently evolved as a viable technique to achieve sub-20nm lithography in time for BPM technology".

== See also ==
- Exchange spring media
- Heat-assisted magnetic recording
- Shingled magnetic recording
