= Tohoku Institute of Technology =

- 東北工業大学
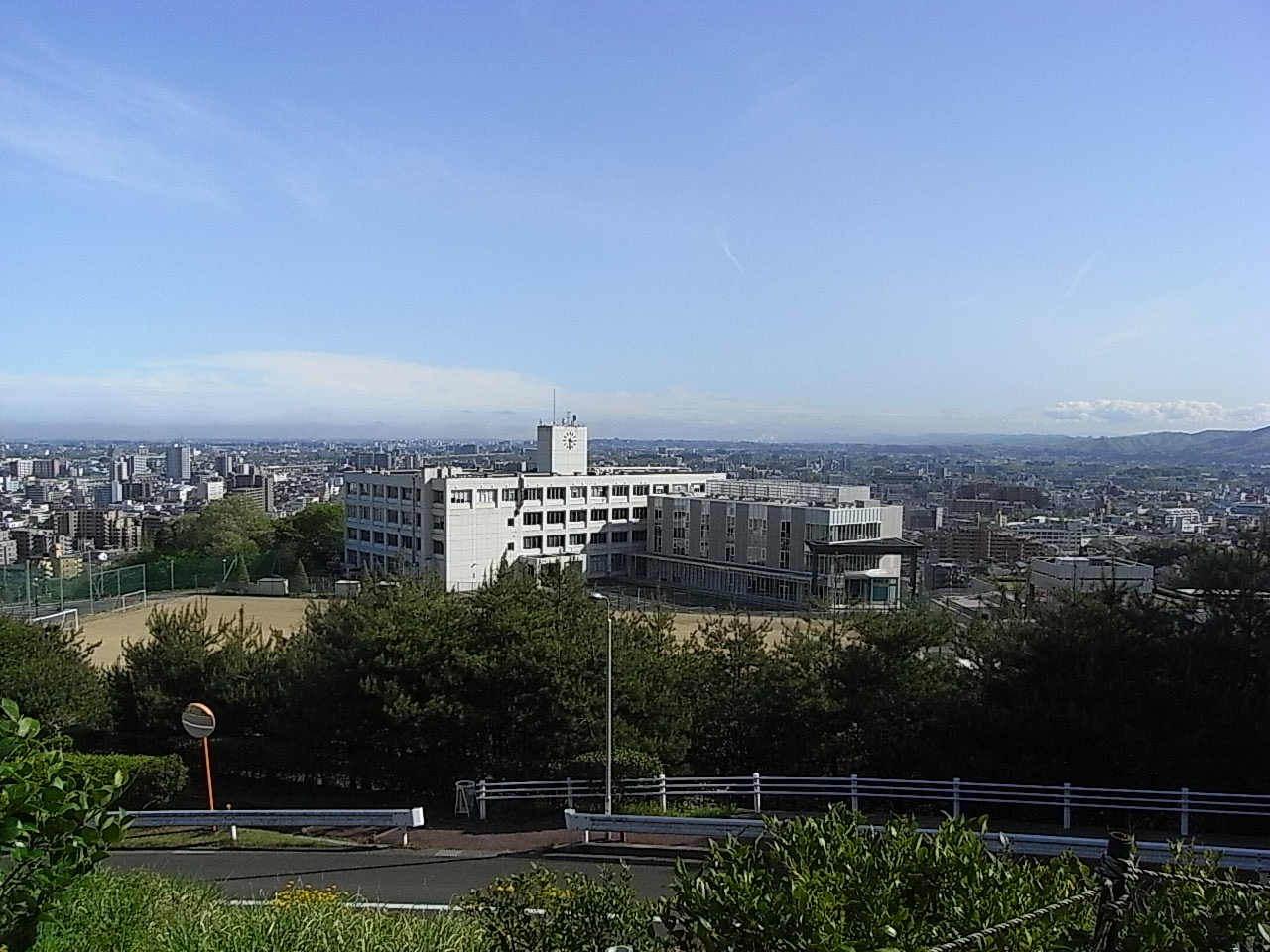
- Tohoku Institute of Technology Nagamachi Campus
- Type: Private
- Established: 1964
- Location: Sendai, Miyagi, Japan
- Campus: Multiple: Yagiyama Campus 38°14′45.2″N 140°51′10.4″E Nagamachi Campus 38°14′4.3″N 140°52′26.5″E
- Website: www.tohtech.ac.jp

Tohoku Institute of Technology (東北工業大学, Tōhoku kōgyō daigaku) is a private university in Sendai, Miyagi, Japan, established in 1964.
