= Heat-assisted magnetic recording =

Magnetic storage technology

Heat-assisted magnetic recording (HAMR) (pronounced "hammer") is a magnetic storage technology for greatly increasing the amount of data that can be stored on a magnetic device such as a hard disk drive by temporarily heating the disk material during writing, which makes it much more receptive to magnetic effects and allows writing to much smaller regions (and much higher levels of data on a disk).

The technology was initially seen as extremely difficult to achieve, with doubts expressed about its feasibility in 2013. The regions being written must be heated in a tiny area – small enough that diffraction prevents the use of normal laser focused heating – and requires a heating, writing and cooling cycle of less than 1 nanosecond, while also controlling the effects of repeated spot-heating on the drive platters, the drive-to-head contact, and the adjacent magnetic data which must not be affected. These challenges required the development of nano-scale surface plasmons (surface guided laser) instead of direct laser-based heating, new types of glass platters and heat-control coatings that tolerate rapid spot-heating without affecting the contact with the recording head or nearby data, new methods to mount the heating laser onto the drive head, and a wide range of other technical, development and control issues that needed to be overcome.

HAMR's planned successor, known as heated-dot magnetic recording (HDMR), or bit-pattern recording, is also under development, although not expected to be available until at least 2025. HAMR drives have the same form factor (size and layout) as existing traditional hard drives, and do not require any change to the computer or other device in which they are installed; they can be used identically to existing hard drives. 32 TB HAMR drives were shipped to some customers for qualification in 2023, then in January 2024, 28 TB and 30 TB HAMR drives were launched.

== Overview ==
There have been a series of technologies developed to allow hard drives to increase in capacity with little effect on cost. To increase storage capacity within the standard form factor, more data must be stored in a smaller space. New technologies to achieve this, have included perpendicular recording (PMR), helium-filled drives, shingled magnetic recording (SMR); however these all appear to have similar limitations to areal density (the amount of data that can be stored on a magnetic platter of a given size). HAMR is a technique that breaks this limit with magnetic media.

The limitation of traditional as well as perpendicular magnetic recording is due to the competing requirements of readability, writeability and stability (known as the magnetic recording trilemma). The problem is that to store data reliably for very small bit sizes the magnetic medium must be made of a material with a very high coercivity (ability to maintain its magnetic domains and withstand any undesired external magnetic influences). The drive head must then overcome this coercivity when data is written. But as the areal density increases, the size occupied by one bit of data becomes so small that the strongest magnetic field that current technology can create is not strong enough to overcome the coercivity of the platter (or in development terms, to flip the magnetic domain), because it is not feasible to create the required magnetic field within such a tiny region. In effect, a point exists at which it becomes impractical or impossible to make a working disk drive because magnetic writing activity is no longer possible on such a small scale.

The coercivity of many materials is temperature dependent. If the temperature of a magnetized object is temporarily raised above its Curie temperature, its coercivity will become much less, until it has cooled down. (This can be seen by heating a magnetized object such as a needle in a flame: when the object cools down, it will have lost much of its magnetization.) HAMR uses this property of magnetic materials to its advantage. A tiny laser within the hard drive temporarily spot-heats the area being written, so that it briefly reaches a temperature where the disk's material temporarily loses much of its coercivity. Almost immediately, the magnetic head then writes data in a much smaller area than would otherwise be possible. The material quickly cools again and its coercivity returns to prevent the written data being easily changed until it is written again. As only a tiny part of the disk is heated at a time, the heated part cools quickly (under 1 nanosecond), and comparatively little power is needed.

The use of heating presented major technical problems, because as of 2013, there was no clear way to focus the required heat into the tiny area required within the constraints imposed by hard drive usage. The time required for heating, writing, and cooling is about 1 nanosecond, which suggests a laser or similar means of heating, but diffraction limits the use of light at common laser wavelengths because these ordinarily cannot focus into anything like the small region that HAMR requires for its magnetic domains. Traditional plated magnetic platters are also not suitable due to their heat conduction properties, so new drive materials must be developed. Seagate Technology and Showa Denko use an iron-platinum alloy in glass platters for HAMR drives. In addition, a wide range of other technical, development, and control issues must be overcome. Seagate, which has been prominent in the development of HAMR drives, commented that the challenges include "attaching and aligning a semiconductor diode laser to an HDD write head and implementing near-field optics to deliver the heat", along with the scale of use which is far greater than previous near-field optic uses. Industry observer IDC stated in 2013 that "The technology is very, very difficult, and there has been a lot of skepticism if it will ever make it into commercial products", with opinions generally that HAMR is unlikely to be commercially available before 2017.

Seagate stated that they overcame the issue of heating focus by developing nano-scale surface plasmons instead of direct laser-based heating. Based on the idea of a waveguide, the laser "travels" along the surface of a guiding material, which is shaped and positioned in order to lead the beam to the area to be heated (about to be written). Diffraction does not adversely affect this kind of wave-guide based focus, so the heating effect can be targeted to the necessary tiny region. The heating issues also require media that can tolerate rapid spot-heating to over 400 °C in a tiny area without affecting the contact between the recording head and the platter, or affecting the reliability of the platter and its magnetic coating. The platters are made of a special "HAMR glass" with a coating that precisely controls how heat travels within the platter once it reaches the region being heated—crucial to prevent power waste and undesired heating or erasure of nearby data regions. Running costs are not expected to differ significantly from non-HAMR drives, since the laser only uses a small amount of power—initially described in 2013 as a few tens of milliwatts and more recently in 2017 as "under 200mW" (0.2 W). This is less than 2.5% of the 7–12 watts used by common 3.5-inch hard drives.

Seagate first demonstrated working HAMR prototypes in continual use during a 3-day event during 2015. In December 2017 Seagate announced that pre-release drives had been undergoing customer trials with over 40,000 HAMR drives and "millions" of HAMR read/write heads already built, and manufacturing capacity was in place for pilot volumes and first sales of production units to be shipped to key customers in 2018 followed by a full market launch of "20 TB+" HAMR drives during 2019, with 40 TB hard drives by 2023, and 100 TB drives by around 2030. At the same time, Seagate also stated that HAMR prototypes had achieved 2 TB per square inch areal density (having grown at 30% per year over 9 years, with a "near-future" target of 10 TB/in^{2} (80 Tb/in^{2})). Single-head transfer reliability was reported to be "over 2 PB" (equivalent to "over 35 PB in a 5 year life on a 12 TB drive", stated to be "far in excess" of typical use), and heating laser power required "under 200 mW" (0.2 W), less than 2.5% of the 8 or more watts typically used by a hard drive motor and its head assembly. Some commentators speculated that HAMR drives would also introduce the use of multiple actuators on hard drives (for speed purposes), as this development was also covered in a Seagate announcement and also stated to be expected in a similar time-scale.

== History ==
- In 1954, engineers of PL Corporation working for RCA filed a patent which described the basic principle of using heat in conjunction with a magnetic field to record data. This was followed by many other patents in this area with the initial focus on tape storage.
- In the 1980s, a class of mass storage device called the magneto-optical drive became commercially available, which used essentially the same technique for writing data to a disk. One advantage of magneto-optic recording over purely magnetic storage at that time was that the bit size was defined by the size of the focused laser spot rather than the magnetic field. In 1988, a 5.25-inch magneto-optic disk could hold 650 megabytes (MB) of data with a road map to several gigabytes (GB); a single 5.25-inch magnetic disk had a capacity of around 100 MB.
- In late 1992, Sony introduced MiniDisc, a music recording and playback format intended to replace audio cassettes. Recordable MiniDiscs used heat-assisted magnetic recording, but the discs were read optically via the Kerr effect.
- In the late 1990s, Seagate commenced research and development related to modern HAMR drives.Seagate Technology As of 2008, considerable progress had already been reported as early phases of introduction of this radical modification of HDD technology got under way.
- In 2006, Fujitsu demonstrates HAMR.
- As of 2007, Seagate believed it could produce 300 terabit (37.5 terabyte (TB)) hard disk drives using HAMR technology. Some news sites erroneously reported that Seagate would launch a 300 TB HDD by 2010. Seagate responded to this news stating that 50 Tbit/in^{2} density is well past the 2010 timeframe and that this may also involve a combination of bit patterned media.
- In early 2009, Seagate achieved 250 Gb (31.25 GB) per square inch using HAMR. This was half of the density achieved via perpendicular magnetic recording (PMR) at that time.
- Hard disk technology progressed rapidly, and as of January 2012, desktop hard disk drives typically had a capacity of 500 to 2000 GB, while the largest-capacity drives were 4 TB. It was recognised as early as 2000 that the then-current technology for hard disk drives would have limitations and that heat-assisted recording was one option to extend the storage capacity.
- In March 2012 Seagate became the first hard drive maker to achieve the milestone storage density of 1 Tbit/in^{2} using HAMR technology.
- In October 2012 TDK announced that they had reached a storage density of 1.5 terabit per square inch, using HAMR. This corresponds to 2 TB per platter in a 3.5" drive.
- November 2013 – Western Digital demonstrates a working HAMR drive, although not yet ready for commercial sales, and Seagate said they expected to begin selling HAMR-based drives around 2016.
- In May 2014, Seagate said they planned to produce low quantities of 6 to 10 TB capacity hard disks in the "near future", but that this would require "a lot of technical investment as you know, it's also a lot of test investment". Though Seagate had not stated that the new hard disks used HAMR, bit-tech.net speculated that they would. Seagate started shipping 8 TB drives around July 2014, but without saying how that capacity was reached; extremetech.com speculated that shingled magnetic recording was used rather than HAMR.
- In October 2014 TDK predicted that HAMR hard disks could be commercially released in 2015, which did not materialize.
- At the Intermag 2015 Conference in Beijing, China, from 11 May to 15 May, Seagate reported HAMR recording using a plasmonic near-field transducer and high-anisotropy granular FePt media at an areal density of 1.402 Tbit/in^{2}.
- In October 2014 TDK, who supply hard drive components to the major hard drive manufacturers, stated that HAMR drives up to around 15 TB would probably start to become available by 2016, and that the results from a prototype 10,000 rpm Seagate hard drive with a TDK HAMR head suggested that the standard 5 year durability required by enterprise customers was also achievable.
- In May 2017, Seagate confirmed that they expected to launch HAMR drives commercially "in late 2018", and the announcement was noted by commentators as being the first time that Seagate had committed to such a specific timeframe for a HAMR drive launch. Commentators at the time suggested a likely capacity at launch could be about 16 TB, although specific capacities and models would not be known until then.
- During December 2017 Seagate announced that HAMR drives had been undergoing pre-pilot trials at customers during 2017 with over 40,000 HAMR drives and "millions" of HAMR read/write heads already built, and manufacturing capacity was in place for pilot volumes in 2018 and a full market launch of "20 TB+" HAMR drives during 2019. They also stated that HAMR development had achieved 2 Tbit per square inch areal density (growing at 30% per year over 9 years with a "near-future" target of 10 Tbit/in^{2}), head reliability of "over 2 PB (petabyte)" per head (equivalent to "over 35 PB in a 5 year life on a 12 TB drive", stated to be "far in excess" of typical use) and heating laser power required "under 200 mW" (0.2 Watt), less than 2.5% of the 8 or more watts typically used by a hard drive motor and its head assembly.
  Some commentators speculated on this announcement, that HAMR drives might also see the introduction of multiple actuators on hard drives (for speed purposes), as this development was also covered at a similar time and also stated to be expected in a similar time-scale.
- On 6 November 2018, an updated road map from Seagate was reported as suggesting that 16 TB drives in 2018 might be partner-only, with mass production relating to 20 TB drives in 2020. However, on 27 November, Seagate stated that production drives were already shipping and passing "key customer" tests, and the supply chain existed for volume production, with 20 TB drives on development in 2019 and 40 TB drives expected for 2023. Shortly after the above announcement, on 4 December 2018, Seagate also announced it was undertaking final testing and benchmarking of 16 TB HAMR drives intended for commercial release, after which customers would be asked to qualify them (validate that they perform satisfactorily, and confirm their performance data) before general release, with 20 TB drives planned for 2020. Seagate commented that "These are the same tests that customers use to qualify every new drive", and cover power usage, read and write performance, correct responses to SCSI and SATA commands, and other tests. As of early December 2018, the drives were meeting expectations.
- At the January 2019 Consumer Electronics Show (CES), Seagate showcased HAMR technology, demonstrating successful read/write tasks using an "Exos" drive with a transparent window to show the drive head in action.
- In February 2019 AnandTech published an update on HAMR, stating detailed product release plans. According to Seagate, 16 TB single actuator HAMR drives were expected to launch commercially in the first half of 2019. They were specified as "over 250 MB/sec, about 80 input/output operations per second (IOPS), and 5 IOPS per TB" (IOPS/TB is an important metric for nearline datastores), with a head lifetime of 4 PB and power in use under 12 W, comparable with existing high performance enterprise hard drives. Beyond that, both 20 TB single actuator HAMR drives, and the company's first dual actuator HAMR drives were expected for 2020. (Dual actuator drives were expected for H2 2019, but were likely to initially use existing perpendicular magnetic recording (PMR) rather than HAMR: their 2019 dual actuator PMR drives were stated to reach around twice the data rate and IOPS of single actuators: 480 MB/s, 169 IOPS, 11 IOPS/TB for a 14 TB PMR drive).
  Seagate also detailed HAMR's road map after launch: the next generation of technologies enabling HAMR drives up to 24 TB were being tested internally with working platters achieving 2.381 Tbit/in^{2} (3 TB per platter) and 10 Tbit/in^{2} in the laboratory, and the third generation of production devices is aiming for 5 Tbit/in^{2} (40 TB drives) by 2023.
- In October 2019, analysts suspected that HAMR would be delayed commercially until 2022, with 10-platter hard drives using perpendicular recording (expected to be followed by shingled magnetic recording (SMR) being used as a stopgap solution).
- During an April 2020 investor earnings call, Seagate's CEO David Mosley stated that demand was being boosted by the 2020 Coronavirus pandemic, and that they expected 20 TB HAMR drives to ship by the end of 2020.
- In October 2020 Seagate confirmed their intention to begin shipping 20 TB HAMR drives in December 2020, with a target of 50 TB by 2026.
- In June 2023, Seagate announced they'll make 32 TB HAMR drives in third quarter in 2023, 40 TB drives on the horizon, 50 TB drives in the labs. And claimed 24 TB PMR drives, 28 TB SMR drives, will be the last of their kinds.
- In January 2024, Seagate launched Mozaic 3+, a series of hard drives utilizing HAMR technology, with 28 TB and 30 TB variants.

== Outlook on the Limitations of HAMR ==
Researchers have utilized recording physics modeling to attempt to determine what recording areal density limit may be achievable with HAMR as it is being implemented . As models are refined, more of the relevant thermomagnetic recording and thermodynamic processes are incorporated - always with some degree of approximation. And without accompanying experimental verification with hardware implementation that the models attempt to simulate, there is always uncertainty in the predictions. Nevertheless, the unfolding of the R&D process with HAMR over more than twenty years has contributed to the confidence that HAMR will prove to be a huge step forward in the achievable areal density of magnetic recording with practical components in commercial products. These publications suggest that combining HAMR with bit patterned media (BPM) could extend areal density beyond 20 Tb/in^{2}.

== Thermomagnetic patterning ==
A similar technology to heat-assisted magnetic recording that has been used mainstream other than for magnetic recording is thermomagnetic patterning. Magnetic coercivity is highly dependent on temperature, and this is the aspect that has been explored, using laser beam to irradiate a permanent magnet film so as to lower its coercivity in the presence of a strong external field that has a magnetization direction opposite to that of the permanent magnet film in order to flip its magnetization. Thus producing a magnetic pattern of opposite magnetizations that can be used for various applications.

=== Setup ===
There are different ways in which the setup can be made, but the underlying principle is still the same. A permanent magnetic strip is deposited on a substrate of silicon or glass, and this is irradiated by a laser beam through a pre-designed mask. The mask is designed specifically for this purpose to prevent the laser beam from irradiating some portions on the magnetic film. This is done in the presence of a very strong magnetic field, which can be generated by a Halbach array. The areas that are exposed/irradiated by the laser beam experience a reduction in their coercivity due to heating by the laser beam, and the magnetization of these portions can be easily flipped by the applied external field, creating the desired patterns.

=== Advantages ===
- Can be used to make many types of patterns
- Useful for magnetic recording, checkered pattern for micro and nanoscale levitation purpose
- Cheap, as the laser used typically consumes low power
- Can be easily implemented
- Can be used for very fine details depending on the finesse with which the laser is used

=== Disadvantages ===
- Potential loss of magnetization (if the temperature exceeds the Curie temperature)
- Superparamagnetic nature of ferromagnets at very small size limits how small one can go
- Boundary issues due to undetermined possibilities at the reversal junction
- Depth of reversal is currently limited
- Not too efficient on silicon substrate as silicon acts like a heat sink (better on glass substrate)
- Residual magnetization is a problem due to the depth of reversal which is limited by the penetration depth of the laser beam

== See also ==
- Exchange spring media
- Microwave-assisted magnetic recording (MAMR) – Also two-dimensional magnetic recording (TDMR), bit-patterned recording (BPR), and "current perpendicular to plane" giant magnetoresistance (CPP/GMR) heads.
- Patterned media
- Perpendicular recording
- Shingled magnetic recording
