= Perpendicular recording =

Magnetic disk drive recording technology

Perpendicular Magnetic Recording
Overview
- Alternate names: PMR, Conventional Magnetic Recording (CMR)
- Main application: Hard disk drive (HDD) platters
- Inventor: Shun-ichi Iwasaki (1976)
- Market entry: 2005 (by Toshiba)

Magnetic Specifications
- Media material: Ferromagnetic thin film (CoCrPt–SiO₂)
- Media Coercivity: High (4,000–5,000 Oe)
- Read/Write assembly: Monopole write head with TMR/GMR read element
- Data density: Up to >1 Tbit/in²

Technology Timeline
- Predecessor: Longitudinal magnetic recording (LMR)
- Successor: Shingled magnetic recording (SMR); Heat-assisted magnetic recording (HAMR)

Perpendicular recording (or perpendicular magnetic recording, PMR), also known as conventional magnetic recording (CMR), is a technology for data recording on magnetic media, particularly hard disks. It was first proven advantageous in 1976 by Shun-ichi Iwasaki, then professor of the Tohoku University in Japan, and first commercially implemented in 2005. The first industry-standard demonstration showing unprecedented advantage of PMR over longitudinal magnetic recording (LMR) at nanoscale dimensions was made in 1998 at IBM Almaden Research Center in collaboration with researchers of Data Storage Systems Center (DSSC) – a National Science Foundation (NSF) Engineering Research Center (ERCs) at Carnegie Mellon University (CMU).

== Advantages ==
Perpendicular recording can deliver more than three times the storage density of traditional longitudinal recording. In 1986, Maxell announced a floppy disk using perpendicular recording that could store 100 kB per inch (39 kB/cm). Perpendicular recording was later used by Toshiba in 3.5" floppy disks in 1989 to permit 2.88 MB of capacity (ED or extra-high density), but they failed to succeed in the marketplace. Since about 2005, the technology has come into use for hard disk drives. Hard disk technology with longitudinal recording has an estimated limit of 100 to 200 gigabits per square inch (16 to 31 Gbit/cm^{2}) due to the superparamagnetic effect, though this estimate is constantly changing. Perpendicular recording was predicted in 2007 to allow information densities of up to around 1,000 Gbit/in^{2} (160 Gbit/cm^{2}). As of August 2010, drives with densities of 667 Gbit/in^{2} (103.4 Gbit/cm^{2}) were available commercially. In 2016 the commercially available density was at least 1,300 Gbit/in^{2} (200 Gbit/cm^{2}). In late 2021, the Seagate disk with the highest density was a consumer-targeted 2.5" BarraCuda. It used 1,307 Gb/in^{2} (202.6 Gb/cm^{2}) density. Other disks from the manufacturer used 1,155 Gbit/in^{2} (179.0 Gbit/cm^{2}) and 1,028 Gbit/in^{2} (159.3 Gbit/cm^{2}).

== Technology ==
Diagram of perpendicular recording. Note how the magnetic flux travels through the second layer of the platter.

The main challenge in designing magnetic information storage media is to retain the magnetization of the medium despite thermal fluctuations caused by the superparamagnetic limit. If the thermal energy is too high, there may be enough energy to reverse the magnetization in a region of the medium, destroying the data stored there. The energy required to reverse the magnetization of a magnetic region is the product of the size of the magnetic region and the uniaxial anisotropy constant K_{u}, which is in turn related to the magnetic coercivity of the material. The larger the magnetic region is and the higher the magnetic coercivity of the material, the more stable the medium is. Conversely, there is a minimum stable size for a magnetic region at a given temperature and coercivity. If it is any smaller it is likely to be spontaneously de-magnetized by local thermal fluctuations. Perpendicular recording uses higher coercivity materials because the head's write field penetrates the medium more efficiently in the perpendicular geometry.

The popular explanation for the advantage of perpendicular recording is that it achieves higher storage densities by aligning the poles of the magnetic elements, which represent bits, perpendicularly to the surface of the disk platter, as shown in the illustration. In this not-quite-accurate explanation, aligning the bits in this manner takes less platter area than what would have been required had they been placed longitudinally. This means cells can be placed closer together on the platter, thus increasing the number of magnetic elements that can be stored in a given area.

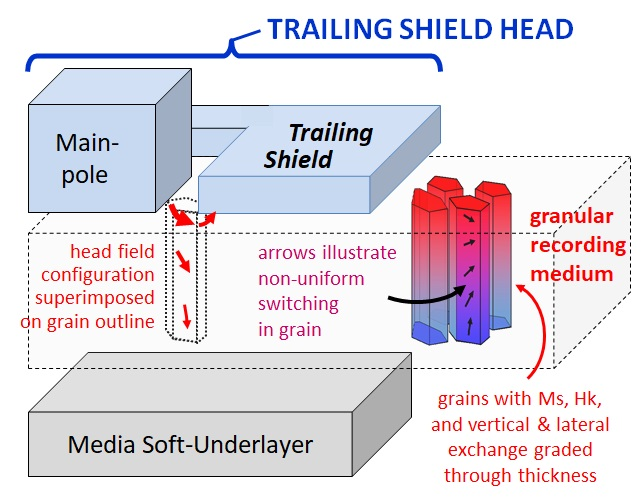
Trailing shield head with granular media. This head design provides higher field gradients and more advantageous field angles for perpendicular recording.

The true picture is a bit more complex. Perpendicular recording does indeed penetrate more deeply into the magnetic storage medium, thereby allowing a closer bit spacing without losing overall bit volume. However, the main density advantage comes from the use of a magnetically "stiffer" (higher coercivity) material as the storage medium.

This is possible because in a perpendicular arrangement the magnetic flux is guided through a magnetically soft (and relatively thick) underlayer beneath the "hard" data storage layer (considerably complicating and thickening the total disk structure). This underlayer can be thought of as part of the write head, completing a magnetic circuit which transects the data storage layer. Having more of the magnetic flux penetrate the data storage layer makes the write head more efficient than a longitudinal head, produces a stronger write field gradient, and thereby allows the use of the higher coercivity magnetic storage medium.

In the early 2000s, three important factors came together which allowed perpendicular recording to exceed the capabilities of longitudinal recording and led to commercial success. First, the development of media with an oxide-segregant exchange-break between grains. Second, the use of a thin 'cap' on the media to control the level of exchange-coupling between grains and to enhance propagation of switching through the thickness of the medium. Third, the expiration in 2005 of the patent for the trailing-shield head invented in 1985 by Michael Mallary. This head offers higher field gradients and more favorable field angles than a simple pole head.

== Implementations ==
Vertimag Systems Corporation, founded by Professor Jack Judy of the University of Minnesota. As a colleague of Iwasaki, created the first perpendicular disk drives, heads and disks in 1984. 5 MB removable floppy drives were demonstrated in IBM PCs to major computer manufacturers. Vertimag went out of business during the PC crash of 1985.

Toshiba produced the first commercially available disk drive (1.8") using this technology in 2005. Shortly thereafter in January 2006, Seagate Technology began shipping its first laptop sized 2.5-inch (64 mm) hard drive using perpendicular recording technology, the Seagate Momentus 5400.3. Seagate also announced at that time that the majority of its hard disk storage devices would utilize the new technology by the end of 2006.

In April 2006, Seagate began shipping the first 3.5 inch perpendicular recording hard drive, the Cheetah 15K.5, with up to 300GB storage, running at 15,000 rpm and claim to have 30% better performance than their predecessors with a data rate of 73–125 Mbyte/s.

In April 2006, Seagate announced the Barracuda 7200.10, a series of 3.5-inch (89 mm) HDDs utilizing perpendicular recording with a maximum capacity of 750 GB. Drives began shipping in late April 2006.

Hitachi announced a 20 GB Microdrive. Hitachi's first laptop drive (2.5-inch) based on perpendicular recording became available in mid-2006, featuring a maximum capacity of 160 GB.

In June 2006, Toshiba announced a 2.5-inch (64 mm) hard drive of 200-GB capacity with mass production starting in August, effectively raising the standard of mobile storage capacity.

In July 2006, Western Digital announced volume production of its WD Scorpio 2.5-inch (64 mm) hard drives using WD-designed and manufactured perpendicular magnetic recording (PMR) technology to achieve 80 GB-per-platter density.

In August 2006 Fujitsu extended its 2.5-inch (64 mm) lineup to include SATA models utilizing perpendicular recording, offering up to 160GB capacity.

In December 2006 Toshiba said its new 100GB two-platter HDD is based on perpendicular magnetic recording (PMR) and was designed in the "short" 1.8-inch form factor.

In December 2006 Fujitsu announced its MHX2300BT series of 2.5-inch (64 mm) hard disk drives, with capacities of 250 and 300 GB.

In January 2007 Hitachi announced the first 1-terabyte hard drive using the technology, which they then delivered in April 2007.

In July 2008 Seagate Technology announced a 1.5 terabyte SATA hard drive using PMR technology.

In January 2009 Western Digital announced the first 2.0 terabyte SATA hard drive using PMR technology.

In February 2009 Seagate Technology announced the first 7,200rpm 2.0 terabyte SATA hard drive using PMR technology with choice of SATA 2 or SAS 2.0 interface.

== See also ==
- Exchange spring media
- Heat-assisted magnetic recording (HAMR)
- Shingled magnetic recording (SMR)
