= Disk read-and-write head =

Small, movable part of a disk drive

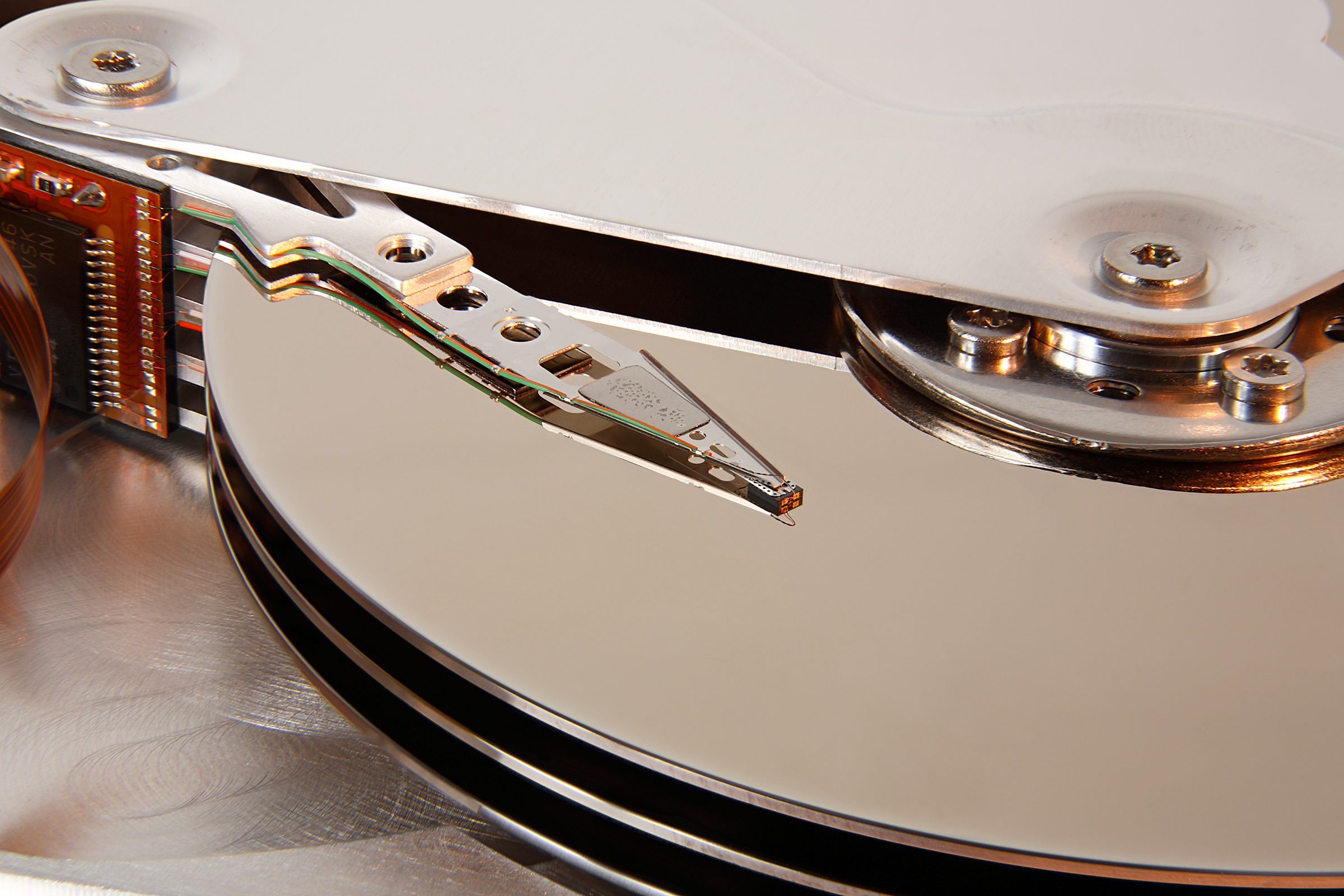
A hard disk head and arm on a platter

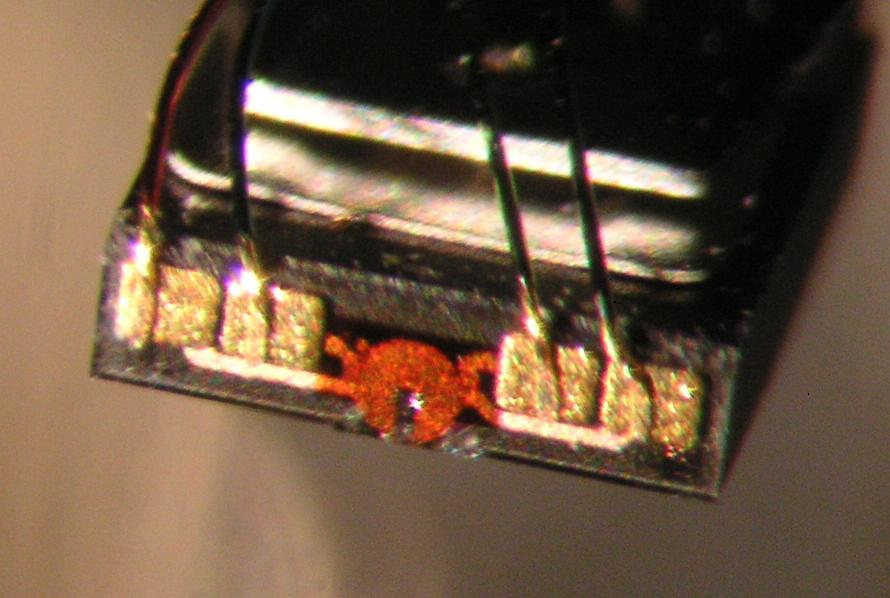
Microphotograph of a hard disk head. The size of the front edge is about 0.3 × 1.2 mm. The functional part of the head is the round, orange structure in the middle. Also note the connection wires bonded to gold-plated pads.

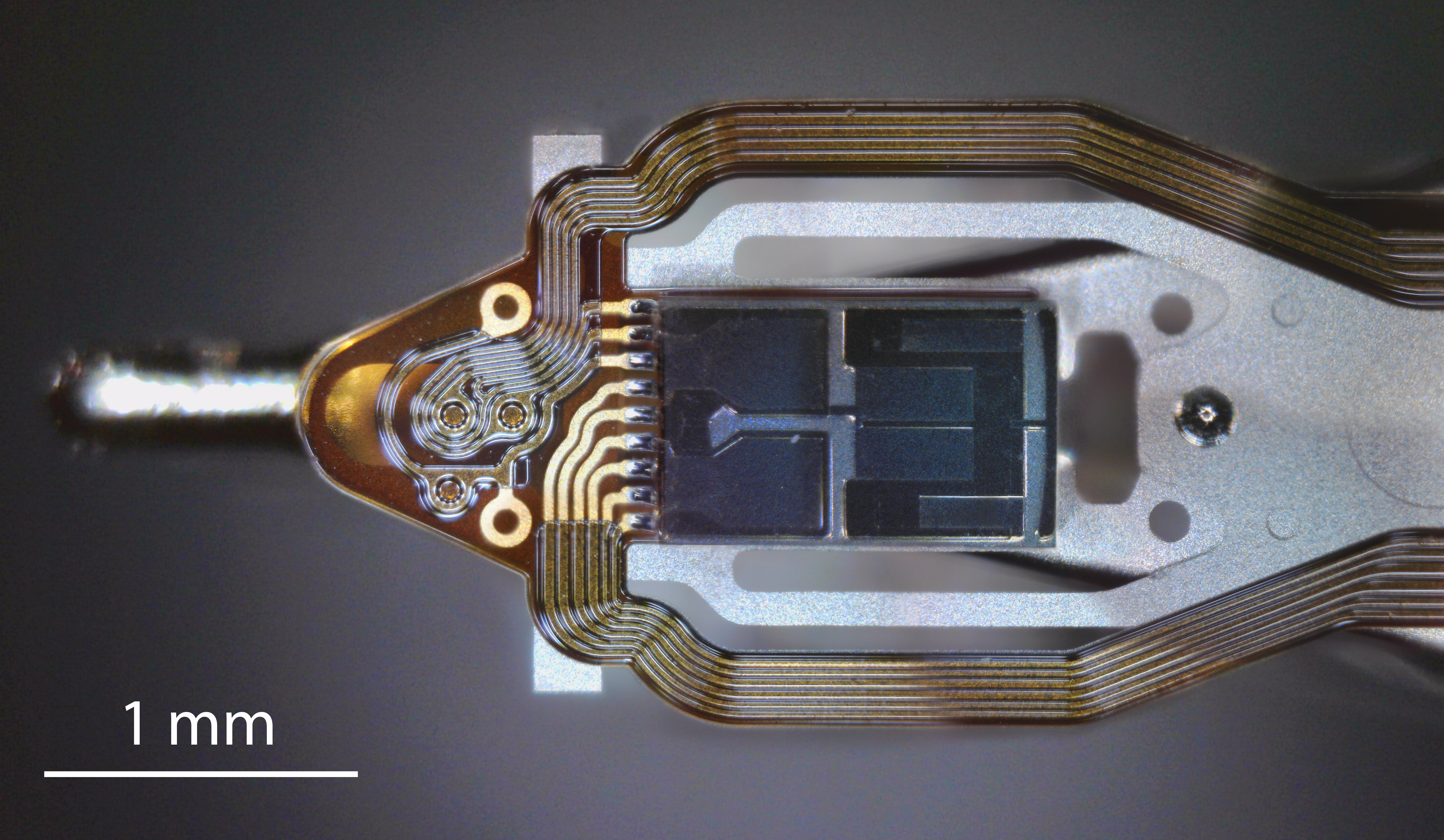
Read–write head of a 3 TB hard disk drive manufactured in 2013. The dark rectangular component is the slider and is 1.25 mm long. The platter surface moves past the head from right to left.

A disk read-and-write head is the small part of a disk drive that moves above the disk platter and transforms the platter's magnetic field into electric current (reads the disk) or, vice versa, transforms electric current into magnetic field (writes the disk). The heads have gone through a number of changes over the years.

In a hard drive, the heads fly above the disk surface with clearance of as little as 3 nanometres. The flying height has been decreasing with each new generation of technology to enable higher areal density. The flying height of the head is controlled by the design of an air bearing etched onto the disk-facing surface of the slider. The role of the air bearing is to maintain a constant flying height as the head moves over the surface of the disk. The air bearings are carefully designed to maintain the same height across the entire platter, despite differing speeds depending on the head distance from the center of the platter. If the head hits the disk's surface, a catastrophic head crash can result. The heads often have a diamond-like carbon coating.

== Inductive heads ==
Inductive heads use the same element for both reading and writing.

=== Traditional head ===
The heads themselves started out similar to the heads in tape recorders, simple devices made out of a tiny C-shaped piece of highly magnetizable material such as permalloy or ferrite wrapped in a fine wire coil. When writing, the coil is energized, a strong magnetic field forms in the gap of the C, and the recording surface adjacent to the gap is magnetized. When reading, the magnetized material rotates past the heads, the ferrite core concentrates the field, and a current is generated in the coil. In the gap the field is very strong and quite narrow. That gap is roughly equal to the thickness of the magnetic media on the recording surface. The gap determines the minimum size of a recorded area on the disk. Ferrite heads are large, and write fairly large features. They must also be flown fairly far from the surface thus requiring stronger fields and larger heads.

=== Metal-in-gap (MIG) heads ===
Metal-in-gap (MIG) heads are ferrite heads with a small piece of metal in the head gap that concentrates the field. This allows smaller features to be read and written. MIG heads were replaced by thin-film heads.

=== Thin-film heads ===
First introduced in 1979 on the IBM 3370 disk drive, thin-film technology uses photolithographic techniques similar to those used on semiconductor devices to fabricate hard drive heads. At the time, these heads had smaller size and greater precision than the ferrite-based heads then in use; they were electronically similar to them and used the same physics. Thin layers of magnetic (Ni–Fe), insulating, and copper coil wiring materials were built on ceramic substrates that were then physically separated into individual read/write heads integrated with their air bearing, significantly reducing the manufacturing cost per unit. Thin-film heads were much smaller than MIG heads and therefore allowed smaller recorded features to be used. Thin-film heads allowed 3.5 inch drives to reach 4 GB storage capacities in 1995. The geometry of the head gap was a compromise between what worked best for reading and what worked best for writing.

== Magnetoresistive heads (MR heads) ==
The next head improvement in head design was to separate the writing element from the reading element allowing the optimization of a thin-film element for writing and a separate thin-film head element for reading. The separate read element uses the magnetoresistive (MR) effect which changes the resistance of a material in the presence of a magnetic field. These MR heads are able to read very small magnetic features reliably, but can not be used to create the strong field used for writing. The term AMR (Anisotropic MR) is used to distinguish it from the later introduced improvement in MR technology called GMR (giant magnetoresistance) and TMR (tunneling magnetoresistance).

The transition to perpendicular magnetic recording (PMR) media has major implications for the write process and the write element of the head structure but less so for the MR read sensor of the head structure.

=== AMR heads ===
The introduction of the AMR head in 1990 by IBM led to a period of rapid areal density increases of about 100% per year.

=== GMR heads ===
In 1997 GMR, giant magnetoresistive heads started to replace AMR heads.

Since the 1990s, a number of studies have been done on the effects of colossal magnetoresistance (CMR), which may allow for even greater increases in density. But so far it has not led to practical applications because it requires low temperatures and large equipment size.

=== TMR heads ===
In 2004, the first drives to use tunneling MR (TMR) heads were introduced by Seagate allowing 400 GB drives with 3 disk platters. Seagate introduced TMR heads featuring integrated microscopic heater coils to control the shape of the transducer region of the head during operation. The heater can be activated prior to the start of a write operation to ensure proximity of the write pole to the disk and medium. This improves the written magnetic transitions by ensuring that the head's write field fully saturates the magnetic disk medium. The same thermal actuation approach can be used to temporarily decrease the separation between the disk medium and the read sensor during the readback process, thus improving signal strength and resolution. By mid-2006 other manufacturers have begun to use similar approaches in their products.

== See also ==
- Applied Magnetics Corporation, once the largest supplier of disk heads
- Tape head
