= Magnetic storage =

Recording of data on a magnetizable medium

Longitudinal recording and perpendicular recording, two types of writing heads on a hard disk

Magnetic storage or magnetic recording is the storage of data on a magnetized medium. Magnetic storage uses different patterns of magnetisation in a magnetizable material to store data and is a form of non-volatile memory. The information is accessed using one or more read/write heads.

Magnetic storage media, primarily hard disks, are widely used to store computer data as well as audio and video signals. In the field of computing, the term magnetic storage is preferred and in the field of audio and video production, the term magnetic recording is more commonly used. The distinction is less technical and more a matter of preference. Other examples of magnetic storage media include floppy disks, magnetic tape, and magnetic stripes on credit cards.

== History ==
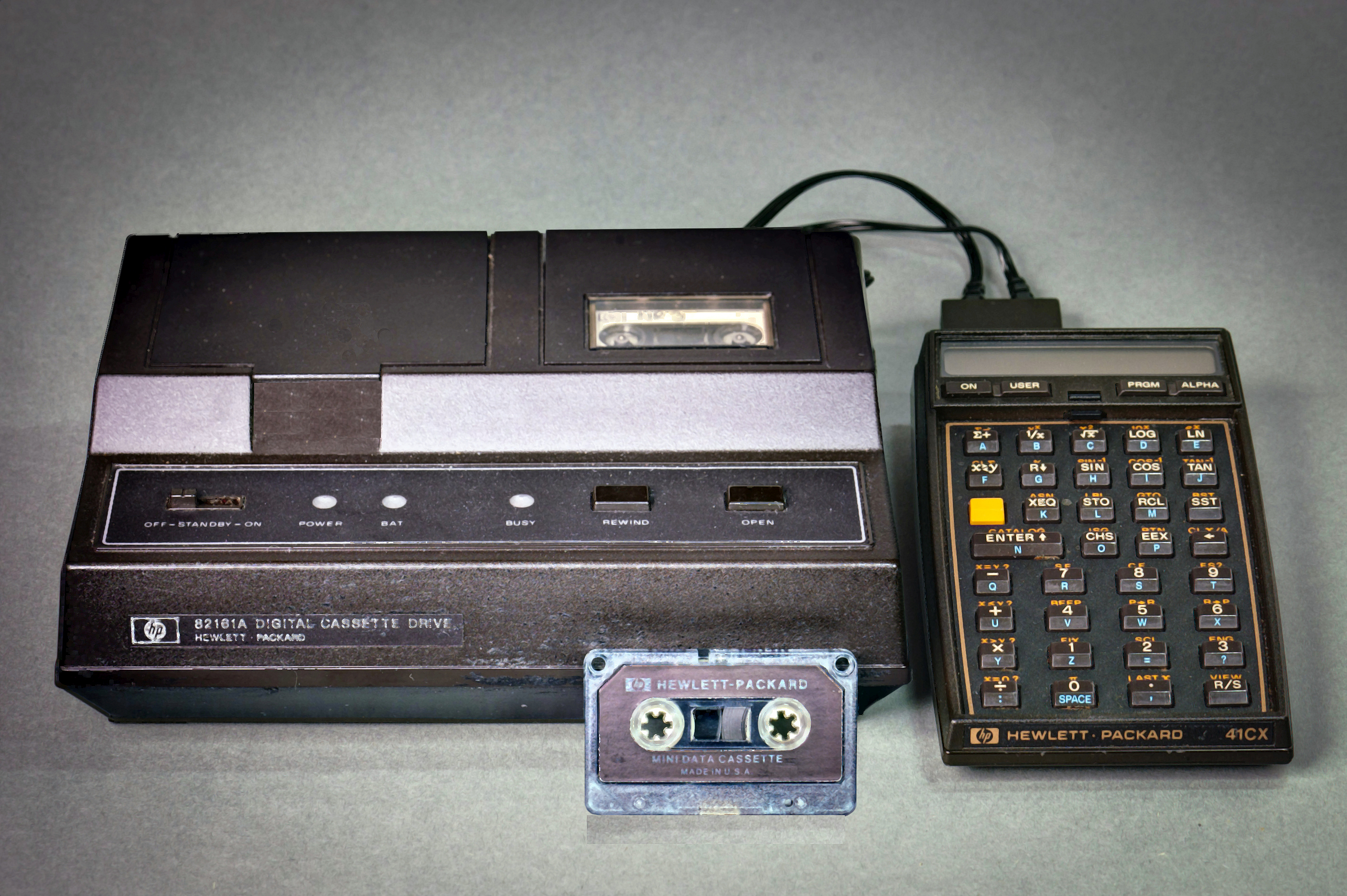
The programmable calculators of the HP-41-series (from 1979) could store data via an external magnetic tape storage device on Mini-Cassettes.

Magnetic storage in the form of wire recording—audio recording on a wire—was publicized by Oberlin Smith in the Sept 8, 1888 issue of Electrical World. Smith had previously filed a patent in September, 1878 but found no opportunity to pursue the idea as his business was machine tools. The first publicly demonstrated magnetic recorder, at Paris Exposition of 1900, was invented by Valdemar Poulsen in 1898. Poulsen's device recorded a signal on a wire wrapped around a drum. In 1928, Fritz Pfleumer developed the first magnetic tape recorder. Early magnetic storage devices were designed to record analog audio signals. Computers and now most audio and video magnetic storage devices record digital data.

In computers, magnetic storage was also used for primary storage in a form of magnetic drum, or core memory, core rope memory, thin-film memory, twistor memory or bubble memory. Unlike modern computers, magnetic tape was also often used for secondary storage.

== Design ==
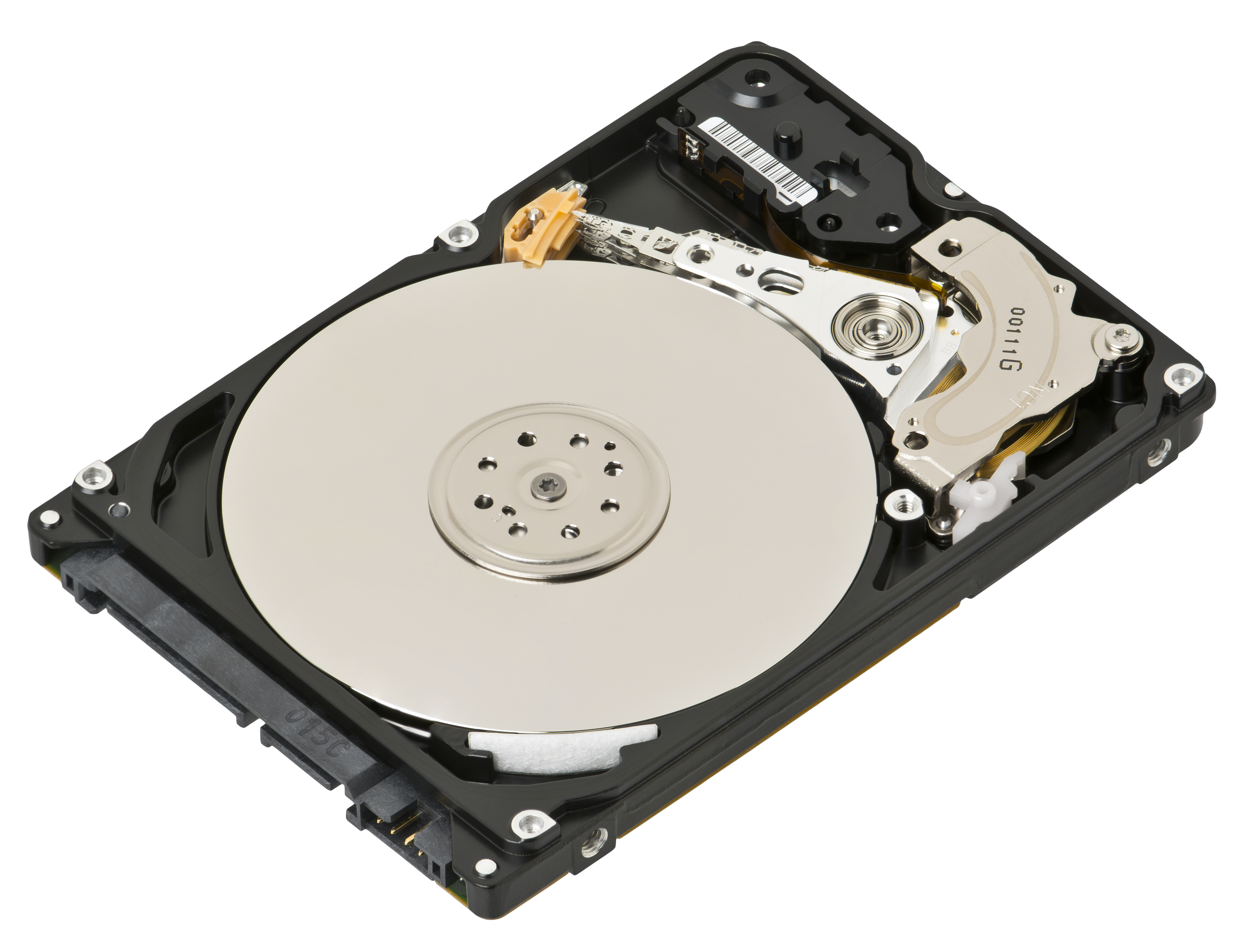
Hard drives use magnetic memory to store giga- and terabytes of data in computers.

Information is written to and read from the storage medium as it moves past devices called read-and-write heads that operate very close (often tens of nanometers) over the magnetic surface. The read-and-write head is used to detect and modify the magnetisation of the material immediately under it. There are two magnetic polarities, each of which is used to represent either 0 or 1.

The magnetic surface is conceptually divided into many small sub-micrometer-sized magnetic regions, referred to as magnetic domains (although these are not magnetic domains in a rigorous physical sense), each of which has a mostly uniform magnetisation. Due to the polycrystalline nature of the magnetic material, each of these magnetic regions is composed of a few hundred magnetic grains. Magnetic grains are typically 10 nm in size and each forms a single true magnetic domain. Each magnetic region in total forms a magnetic dipole which generates a magnetic field. In older hard disk drive (HDD) designs the regions were oriented horizontally and parallel to the disk surface, but for newer disks, the orientation was changed to perpendicular to allow for closer magnetic domain spacing.

Older hard disk drives used iron(III) oxide (Fe_{2}O_{3}) as the magnetic material, but current disks use a cobalt-based alloy.

For reliable storage of data, the recording material needs to resist self-demagnetisation, which occurs when the magnetic domains repel each other. Magnetic domains written too close together in a weakly magnetisable material will degrade over time due to rotation of the magnetic moment of one or more domains to cancel out these forces. The domains rotate sideways to a halfway position that weakens the readability of the domain and relieves the magnetic stresses.

A write head magnetises a region by generating a strong local magnetic field, and a read head detects the magnetisation of the regions. Early HDDs used an electromagnet both to magnetise the region and to then read its magnetic field by using electromagnetic induction. Later versions of inductive heads included Metal In Gap (MIG) heads and thin-film heads. As data density increased, read heads using magnetoresistance (MR) came into use; the electrical resistance of the head changed according to the strength of the magnetism from the platter. Later development made use of spintronics; in read heads, the magnetoresistive effect was much greater than in earlier types, and was dubbed "giant" magnetoresistance (GMR). In today's heads, the read and write elements are separate, but in close proximity, on the head portion of an actuator arm. The read element is typically magneto-resistive while the write element is typically thin-film inductive.

The heads are kept from contacting the platter surface by the air that is extremely close to the platter; that air moves at or near the platter speed. The record and playback head are mounted on a block called a slider, and the surface next to the platter is shaped to keep it just barely out of contact. This forms a type of air bearing.

== Magnetic recording classes ==
=== Analog recording ===
Analog recording is based on the fact that remnant magnetisation of a given material depends on the magnitude of the applied field. The magnetic material is normally in the form of tape, with the tape in its blank form being initially demagnetised. When recording, the tape runs at a constant speed. The writing head magnetises the tape with current proportional to the signal. A magnetisation distribution is achieved along the magnetic tape. Finally, the distribution of the magnetisation can be read out, reproducing the original signal. The magnetic tape is typically made by embedding magnetic particles (approximately 0.5 micrometers in size) in a plastic binder on polyester film tape. The most commonly used of these was ferric oxide, though chromium dioxide, cobalt, and later pure metal particles were also used. Analog recording was the most popular method of audio and video recording. Since the late 1990s, however, tape recording has declined in popularity due to digital recording.

=== Digital recording ===
Instead of creating a magnetisation distribution in analog recording, digital recording only needs two stable magnetic states, which are the +Ms and −Ms on the hysteresis loop. Examples of digital recording are floppy disks, hard disk drives (HDDs), and tape drives. HDDs offer large capacities at reasonable prices; as of 2024, consumer-grade HDDs offer data storage at about US$15–20 per terabyte.

=== Magneto-optical recording ===
Magneto-optical recording writes and reads optically. When writing, the magnetic medium is heated locally by a laser, which induces a rapid decrease of coercive field. Then, a small magnetic field can be used to switch the magnetisation. The reading process is based on magneto-optical Kerr effect. The magnetic medium are typically an amorphous R–Fe–Co thin film (R being a rare earth element). One prominent consumer application is the MiniDisc developed by Sony.

=== Domain propagation memory ===
Domain propagation memory is also called bubble memory. The basic idea is to control domain wall motion in a magnetic medium that is free of microstructure. Bubble refers to a stable cylindrical domain. Data is then recorded by the presence/absence of a bubble domain. Domain propagation memory has high insensitivity to shock and vibration, so its application is usually in space and aeronautics.

== Technical details ==
=== Access method ===
Magnetic storage media can be classified as either sequential access memory or random access memory, although in some cases the distinction is not perfectly clear. The access time can be defined as the average time needed to gain access to stored records. In the case of magnetic wire, the read/write head only covers a very small part of the recording surface at any given time. Accessing different parts of the wire involves winding the wire forward or backward until the point of interest is found. The time to access this point depends on how far away it is from the starting point. The case of ferrite-core memory is the opposite. Every core location is immediately accessible at any given time.

Hard disks and modern linear serpentine tape drives do not precisely fit into either category. Both have many parallel tracks across the width of the media and the read/write heads take time to switch between tracks and to scan within tracks. Different spots on the storage media take different amounts of time to access. For a hard disk this time is typically less than 10 ms, but tapes might take as much as 100 s.

== Coding schemes ==
Magnetic disk heads and magnetic tape heads cannot pass DC (direct current), so the coding schemes for both tape and disk data are designed to minimize the DC offset. Most magnetic storage devices use error correction.

Many magnetic disks internally use some form of run-length limited coding and partial-response maximum-likelihood.

== Current usage ==
As of 2021, common uses of magnetic storage media are for computer data mass storage on hard disks and the recording of analog audio and video works on analog tape. Since much of audio and video production is moving to digital systems, the usage of hard disks is expected to increase at the expense of analog tape. Digital tape and tape libraries are popular for the high capacity data storage of archives and backups. Floppy disks see some marginal usage, particularly in dealing with older computer systems and software. Magnetic storage is also widely used in some specific applications, such as bank cheques (MICR) and credit/debit cards (mag stripes).

== Future ==
A new type of magnetic storage, called magnetoresistive random-access memory or MRAM, is being produced that stores data in magnetic bits based on the tunnel magnetoresistance (TMR) effect. Its advantage is non-volatility, low power usage, and good shock robustness. The first generation that was developed was produced by Everspin Technologies, and utilized field induced writing. The second generation is being developed through two approaches: thermal-assisted switching (TAS) which is currently being developed by Crocus Technology, and spin-transfer torque (STT) on which Crocus, Hynix, IBM, and several other companies are working. However, with storage density and capacity orders of magnitude smaller than a hard disk, MRAM is useful in applications where moderate amounts of storage with a need for very frequent updates are required, which flash memory cannot support due to its limited write endurance. Six state MRAM is also being developed, echoing four bit multi level flash memory cells, that have six different bits, as opposed to two.

Research is also being done by Aleksei Kimel at Radboud University in the Netherlands towards the possibility of using terahertz radiation rather than using standard electropulses for writing data on magnetic storage media. By using terahertz radiation, writing time can be reduced considerably (50x faster than when using standard electropulses). Another advantage is that terahertz radiation generates almost no heat, thus reducing cooling requirements.

== See also ==
- Digital Audio Tape
- Digital Data Storage
- Disk storage
- Karlqvist gap
- Magnetoresistive random-access memory (MRAM)
- Magnetic recording methods:
  - Heat-assisted magnetic recording (HAMR)
  - Longitudinal magnetic recording (LMR)
  - Perpendicular magnetic recording (PMR), also known as conventional magnetic recording (CMR)
  - Shingled magnetic recording (SMR)
- Marvin Camras (1916–1995), American electrical engineer and inventor, major contributor to magnetic recording technology
