= ST3000DM001 =

Seagate Technology hard disk drive

- Former logo of Seagate, used until the redesign in 2015

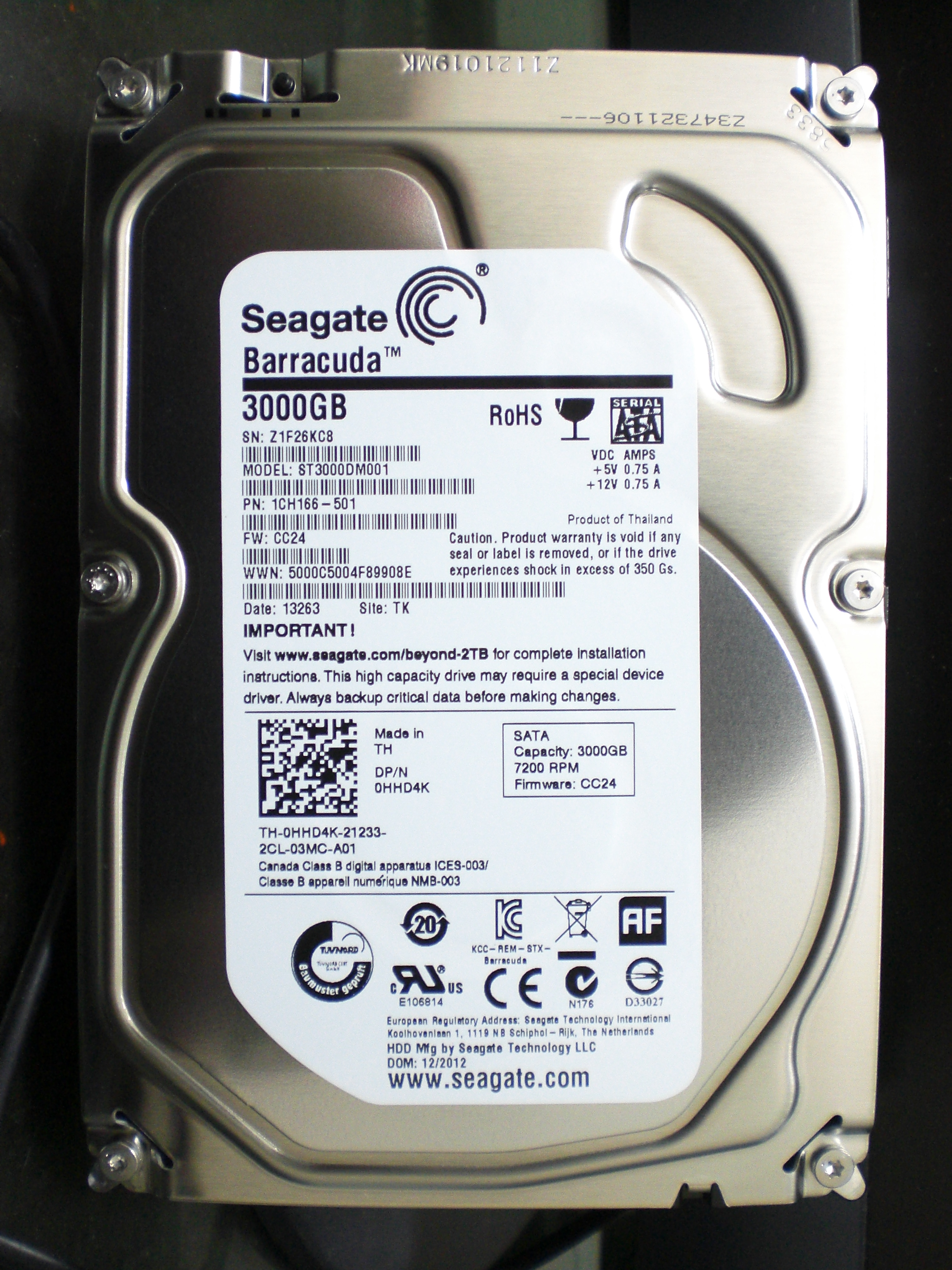
- A ST3000DM001 drive manufactured on 30 December 2012
- Manufacturer: Seagate Technology
- Introduced: 2011
- Type: Hard disk drive
- Memory: 3 terabyte storage with 64MiB DRAM cache
- Connection: SATA 3
- Speed: 7200 RPM

The ST3000DM001 is a hard disk drive released by Seagate Technology in 2011 as part of the Seagate Barracuda series. It has a capacity of 3 terabytes (TB) and a spindle speed of 7200 RPM. This particular drive model was reported to have unusually high failure rates, due to a parking ramp that was made from different materials. The failure rates were approximately 5.7 times higher in comparison to other 3 TB drives, for which Seagate faced a class-action lawsuit.

== Specifications ==
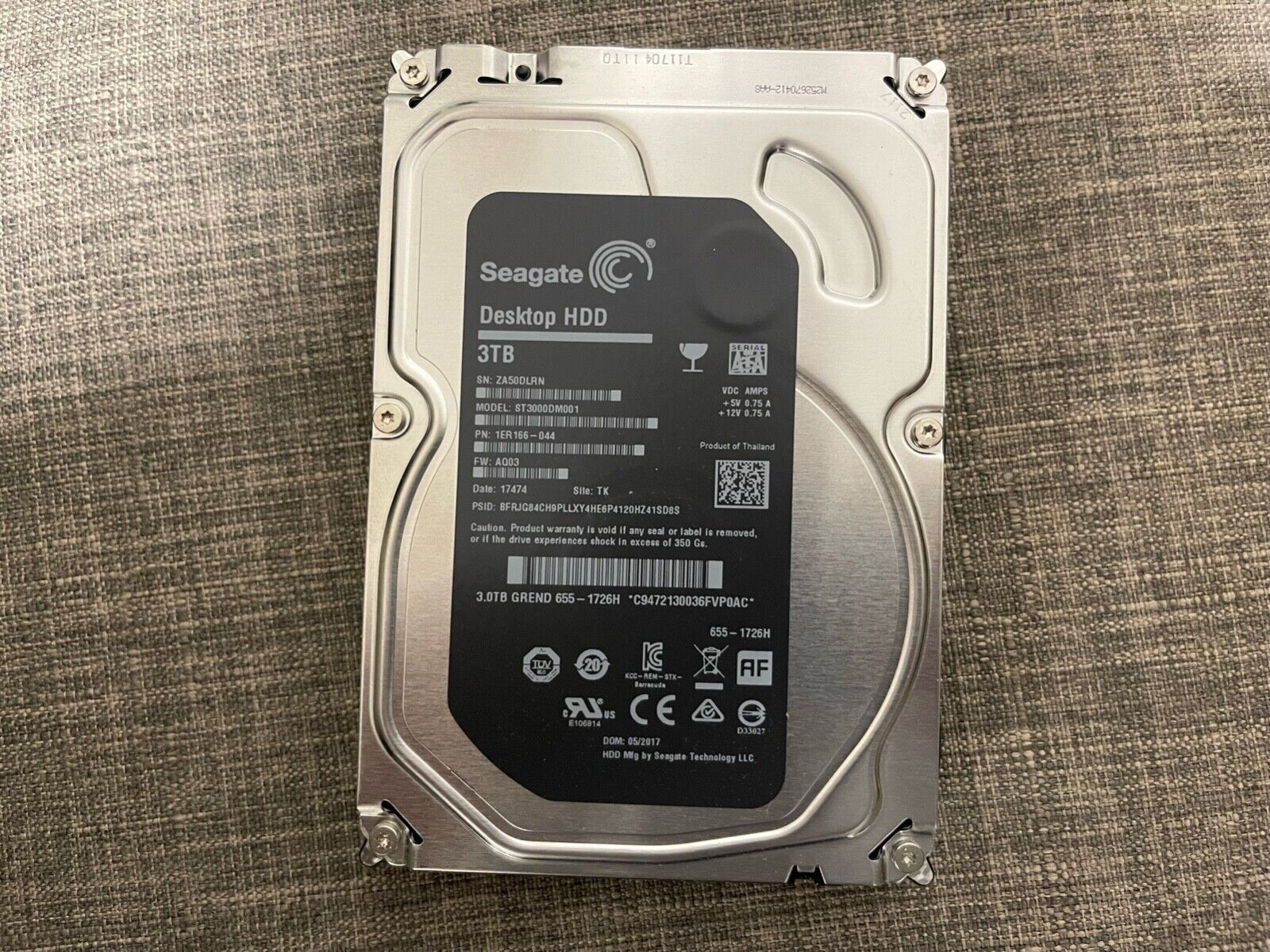
Another ST3000DM001 HDD made on 25 May 2017 for Apple (as shown by the black label)

The ST3000DM001 uses three 1 TB platters, compared to five platters in the previous generation Barracuda XT drive, and has a spindle speed of 7200 RPM. The drive uses a 40 nm dual-core LSI controller and 64 MB of DDR2-800 as the DRAM cache. As part of the release of its 1 TB-platter drives, Seagate announced that it was phasing out its Barracuda Green line of 5900 RPM hard drives.

== Initial reception ==
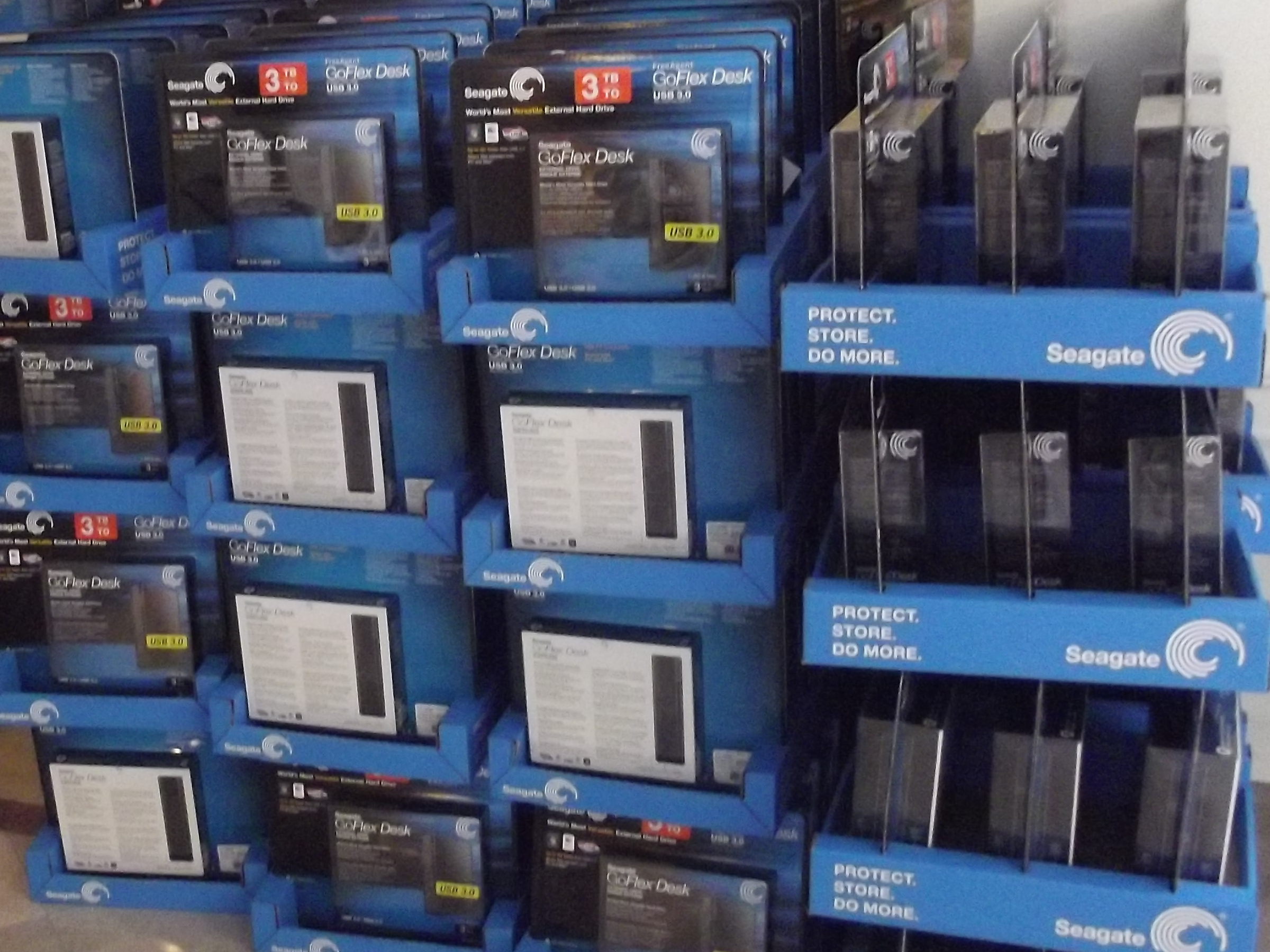
ST3000DM001 as external hard drives in retail packaging

Anand Lal Shimpi of AnandTech noted that the ST3000DM001 is "a bit faster in sequential performance than the old Barracuda XT, at lower power consumption" and that "Seagate appears to have optimized the drive's behavior for lower power rather than peak performance". He said he was "personally OK" with the lower performance under heavy loads as long as the drive is used together with a solid-state drive (SSD) in a system.

== Failures ==
=== Observations at Backblaze ===
Backblaze, a remote backup service company, observed that its ST3000DM001 drives have failed at rates far higher than the average of other hard drives. Only 251 of the 4,190 ST3000DM001 hard drives placed in service in 2012 were still in service as of 31 March 2015.

According to Backblaze, the company switched to Seagate 3 TB hard drives after the 2011 Thailand floods disrupted the supply of hard drives and increased their prices by 200–300%. Backblaze, which normally used HGST 3 TB hard drives, was only able to find Seagate 3 TB drives in "decent quantity". Backblaze noted that the failure rates of the ST3000DM001 did not follow a bathtub curve typically followed by hard disk drive failure rates, instead having 2.7% failing in 2012, 5.4% failing in 2013, and 47.2% failing in 2014. Other 3 TB hard drives that Backblaze placed in service in 2012, which was operated in a similar environment as the Seagate drives, did not show signs of increased failure.

Joel Hruska of ExtremeTech noted that Backblaze was unable to explain the high failure rates of the ST3000DM001 compared to other products. Hruska pointed out that Seagate cut the warranty for these drives, along with most other hard disk drive manufacturers, from three years to one year in 2012. Hruska provided supplier-change or part substitution, shipping of substandard hardware to increase profits, and Backblaze's use of consumer hard drives in an enterprise environment as possible explanations. Paul Alcorn of Tom's Hardware pointed out that of the 3 TB hard disk drive models that were in service with Backblaze, the ST3000DM001 was the only drive without a rotational vibration sensor that counteracts excessive vibration in heavy-usage cases.

=== Cause ===
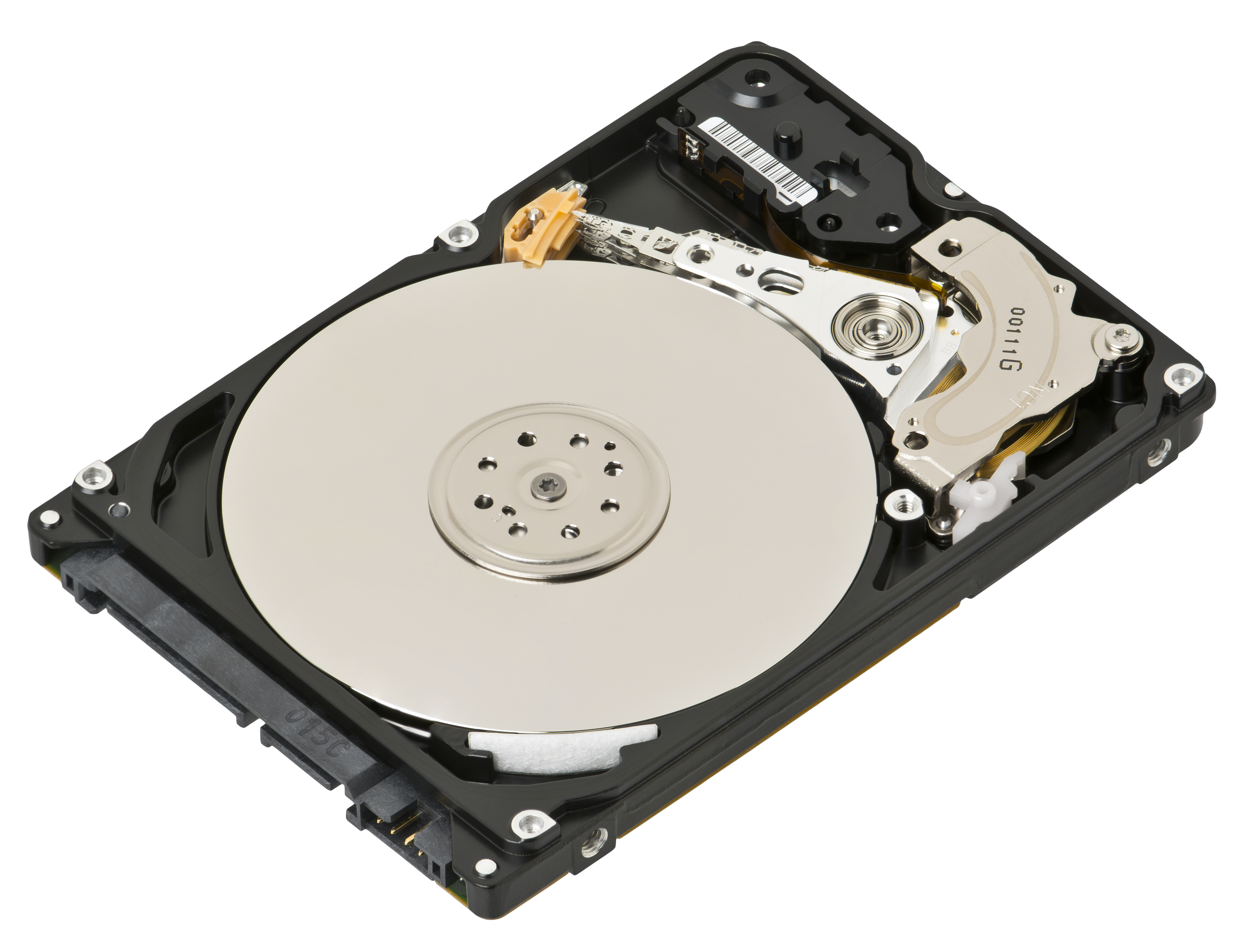
The internals of a different disk model. The parking ramp is the orange part behind the center. When the disk is powered off or in idle, the heads of the disk are parked here

In July 2021, 9to5Mac reported that because the disk was included in the Apple Time Capsule it started to show high failure rates. The issue was caused by the parking ramp that was made out of different materials, according to the German data recovery company 030 Datenrettung.

=== Class action ===
In 2016, Seagate faced a class action over the failure rates of its ST3000DM001 3 TB drives. Law firm Hagens Berman filed the lawsuit on 1 February in the United States District Court for the Northern District of California, and primarily cited reliability data provided by Backblaze. The lawsuit also pointed to user reviews of the hard disk drive on Newegg, which totaled more than 700 reviews with 2 or fewer stars.

The lawsuit lists Christopher Nelson, who purchased a Seagate Backup Plus 3 TB drive and a Seagate Barracuda 3 TB hard disk drive in October 2011, as its plaintiff. Both products subsequently failed, and the lawsuit contended that Seagate replaced them with inherently faulty products.

Steve Berman, the managing partner of Hagens Berman, said that the hard drives "failed to deliver on Seagate's promises, and replacements from Seagate were just as defective". Bruno Ferreira of The Tech Report compared the lawsuit with the high failure rates faced by the IBM Deskstar 75GXP and 60GXP hard drives in 2002. Paul Alcorn of Tom's Hardware argued that Backblaze used the drives in a manner that "far exceeded the warranty conditions" and questioned the "technical merits" of the lawsuit.

On 15 June 2018, Judge Joseph Spero ruled that the class action plaintiffs must separate into multiple classes, as there was too much variability in failure rates to combine all claims into a single class. In 2019, the plaintiffs were denied class certification a second time.
