= Seagate Barracuda =

Series of hard disk drives produced by Seagate Technology

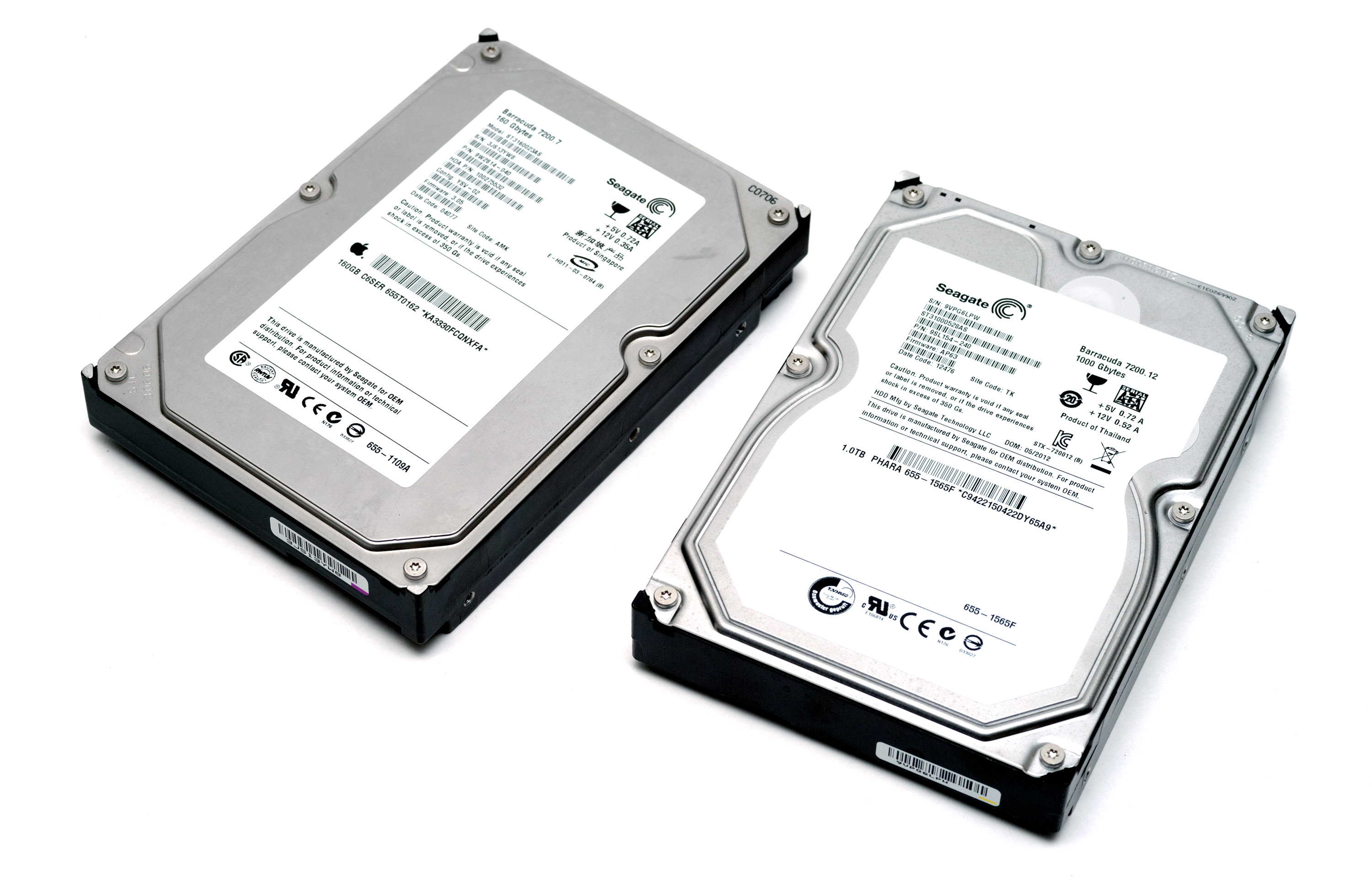
- A pair of Seagate Barracuda hard drives (160 GB 7200.7 & 1000 GB 7200.12)
- Media type: Hard disk drive
- Capacity: 1.7 GB – 24 TB(helium filled models)
- Developed by: Seagate Technology
- Dimensions: 3.5": 26.11 × 101.85 × 146.99 mm or 19.99/20.2 × 101.85 × 146.99 2.5": 15 × 69.85 × 100.35 mm or 7 x 69.85 × 100.35 mm
- Weight: 3.5": ~600g or ~400g(slim 20mm models) 2.5": ~190g or ~90g
- Usage: Computers, Notebooks, Consoles, Set-top boxes, etc.
- Released: Late 1992

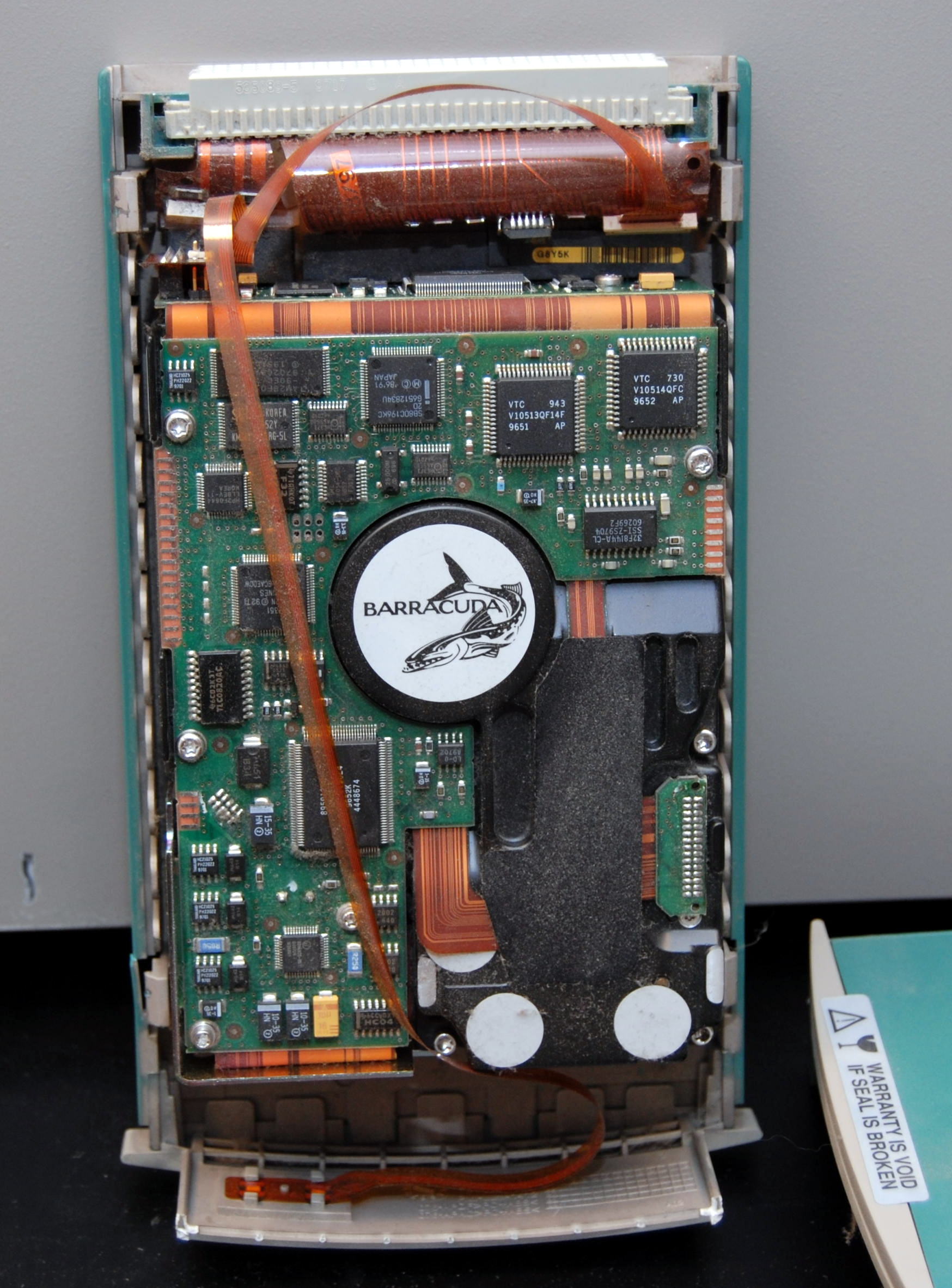
Barracuda hard disk from an Alphaserver (4.3 GB)

The Seagate Barracuda is a series of hard disk drives and later solid state drives produced by Seagate Technology that was first introduced in 1993.

The line initially focused on high-capacity, high-performance SCSI hard drives until introducing ATA models in 1999 and SATA models in 2002. Since 2001, the Barracuda is Seagate's most popular product line as the hard disk drive industry started to move to a 7200 RPM spindle speed.

== History ==
In 1992, Seagate introduced the first ever 7200-RPM spindle speed hard drive, the Barracuda 1, sold in capacity of 1.7 GB with a size of 3.5 inches. The first model was much thicker than modern 3.5 drives at 1.6 inches(42mm) thick compared to 1 inch for standard 3.5(26mm) drives. The barracuda 2LP(low profile) was the first 7200rpm drive released in early 1994 to use the slimmer 26mm 3.5 form factor just like modern drives. It contained 6 platters inside storing 2GB in total which is large for a drive in 1994.

On July 24, 1995, Seagate shipped its one millionth Barracuda hard drive.

On November 13, 2000, Seagate launched the Barracuda 180 series, it had the world's highest capacity hard drives at the time, with 181 GB. It was the last to ever use the thicker 42mm Half Height Z height as it contained 12 platters inside for maximum capacity.

On December 3, 2001, Seagate introduced the Barracuda 36ES2 series, one of the last Barracuda SCSI series.

On December 2, 2002, Seagate began shipping the first ever Serial ATA hard drive, the Barracuda 7200.7 series. Their Serial ATA hard drives were made available for retail consumers on March 24, 2003.

== SCSI Models ==
=== Barracuda 1 & 2 ===
In 1993, Seagate released the first Barracuda drive, with the ST11950. The drive had a capacity of 2.03 GB (1.69 GB formatted), was available with FAST SCSI-2 (N/ND models) or WIDE SCSI-2 (W/WD models) interface, and was the first hard drive ever to have a spindle speed of 7200-RPM. Owing to the rotational speed, it was very fast but very expensive at the time. The FAST SCSI-2 interface of the N/ND model drives targeted them to servers and high-performance systems, with a 10 MB/s transfer speed. They came in a 3.5 inch "half height" format that was popular at the time, giving it a height of 1.63 inches or 41.4 mm. The drives came with a 5-year warranty, 500,000 hour Mean Time Between Failures rating, and a 4.17 msec latency. Bus speeds of the original Barracuda line would soon go up to 100 Mbit/s by 1995, even as capacity increased substantially in the first four iterations of the Barracuda.

The Barracuda 1 series was immediately followed up by the Barracuda 2 series, which were the same for the most part except they offered a slightly higher capacity of 2.57 GB (2.1 GB formatted). There was an additional ST12450 model available, which offered 2 heads in parallel which meant it had two read and write channels at once, but it offered a slightly lower capacity of 1.8 GB. It was based on the Seagate Sabre 8" and Seagate Elite 5.25" lines of hard disk drives.

=== Barracuda 4 ===
The third generation Barracuda drive announced October 18th, 1993, with an expected release in the following year. Capacity was increased up to 4.1 GB formatted, but the drives were otherwise mostly the same to the Barracuda 1 & 2. 6 models were available, with N/ND models using the SCSI-2 FAST interface with 10 MB/s transfer speed while the W/WD/WC/DC used the SCSI-2 WIDE interface, which offered 20 MB/s speed.

=== Barracuda 180 ===
In late 2000, Seagate introduced the Barracuda 180 series with the ST1181677LW and ST1181677LC. They were the highest capacity hard drives in the world at the time. They had 12 platters with about 15 GB per platter, adding up to 181 GB. The 12 platters made the drive larger than most drives at the time, with 1.6 inches in height. They had Tagged Command Queuing with up to 64 commands and a MTBF rating of 1.2 million hours, or 137 years. The drive has a 26–47 MB/s transfer speed with the Ultra160 SCSI interface, and an average access time of 12.1 ms with 4 MB of on-board cache. On release the drives cost $1,850.

Later Seagate replaced the base models with the ST1181677LWV and ST1181677LCV, they had 16 MB of on-board cache versus 4, and were hot-swappable if they had the right cable connection, but were otherwise the same.

The series was discontinued in early 2004.

=== Barracuda 36ES ===
The last SCSI Barracuda series was announced in December 2001, with the Barracuda 36ES2 series. The series was a successor to the Barracuda 36ES series. 4 models were available in 2 capacities. The ST318418N and ST318438LW had 18.4 GB while the ST336918N and ST336938LW had 36.9 GB, with 2 MB of on-board cache. Both capacity drives used one platter, with the 18.4 GB ones using one side of the platter. These drives were given an MTBF rating of 800,000 hours, 4.17 msec latency, and a transfer rate of 298 to 500 Mbit/s for 36.9 GB models and 434 to 500 Mbit/s for 18.4 GB models.

=== SCSI Models Table ===
Model no.	Gen.	Released	Price	Capacity (Formatted)	Cache	Speed	Interface	Feature set	Sector Size (Default)	Notes	Information
ST11950N/ND	1	1993		1.69 GB	1 MB	7200 RPM	SCSI-2 FAST	TCQ	512 bytes	1 Series	1/2 Series Manual
ST11950W/WD	1	1993		1.69 GB	1 MB (W) 512 KB (WD)	7200 RPM	SCSI-2 WIDE	TCQ	512 bytes	1 Series	1/2 Series Manual
ST12450W/WD	2	1993	$1,800	1.85 GB	1 MB	7200 RPM	SCSI-2 FAST/WIDE	TCQ	512 bytes	2 Series	1/2 Series Manual
ST12550N/ND	2	1993		2.1 GB	1 MB	7200 RPM	SCSI-2 FAST	TCQ	512 bytes	2 Series	1/2 Series Manual
ST12550W/WD	2	1993		2.1 GB	1 MB (W) 512 KB (WD)	7200 RPM	SCSI-2 WIDE	TCQ	512 bytes	2 Series	1/2 Series Manual
ST15150N/ND	3	10-18-1993	$2,650	4.19GB	1 MB	7200 RPM	SCSI-2 FAST	TCQ	512 bytes	4 Series	Series Manual
ST15150W/WD/WC/DC	3	10-18-1993		4.19GB	1 MB	7200 RPM	SCSI-2 WIDE	TCQ	512 bytes	4 Series	Series Manual
ST12551N		1995		0.99 GB		7200 RPM		TCQ	512 bytes	2LP Series	Series Manual
ST31250N/ND		1995		0.99 GB	512 KB	7200 RPM	SCSI-2 FAST	TCQ	512 bytes	2LP Series	Series Manual
ST31250W/WD		1995		0.99 GB	512 KB	7200 RPM	SCSI-2 WIDE	TCQ	512 bytes	2LP Series	Series Manual
ST31250WC/DC		1995		0.99 GB	512 KB	7200 RPM	SCSI-2 WIDE	TCQ	512 bytes	2LP Series	Series Manual
ST32550N/ND		1995		2.09 GB	512 KB	7200 RPM	SCSI-2 FAST	TCQ	512 bytes	2LP Series	Series Manual
ST32550W/WD		1995		2.09 GB	512 KB	7200 RPM	SCSI-2 WIDE	TCQ	512 bytes	2LP Series	Series Manual
ST32550WC/DC		1995		2.09 GB	512 KB	7200 RPM	SCSI-2 WIDE	TCQ	512 bytes	2LP Series	Series Manual
ST32171N		1996		2.15 GB	512 KB	7200 RPM	SCSI-3 FAST-20	TCQ	512 bytes	4LP Series	Series Manual
ST32171W		1996		2.15 GB	512 KB	7200 RPM	SCSI-3 WIDE-20	TCQ	512 bytes	4LP Series	Series Manual
ST34371N		1996		4.35 GB	512 KB	7200 RPM	SCSI-3 FAST-20	TCQ	512 bytes	4LP Series	Series Manual
ST34371W		1996		4.35 GB	512 KB	7200 RPM	SCSI-3 WIDE-20	TCQ	512 bytes	4LP Series	Series Manual
ST19171N	9	1996		9.1 GB	512 KB	7200 RPM	SCSI-3 FAST-20	TCQ	512 bytes	9 Series	Series Manual
ST19171W/WD/WC/DC	9	1996		9.1 GB	512 KB 2 MB	7200 RPM	SCSI-3 WIDE-20	TCQ	512 bytes	9 Series	Series Manual
ST136475LC/LW	7	2000		36.4 GB	1 MB or 4 MB	7200 RPM	Ultra2 WIDE SCSI	TCQ	512 bytes	36 Series	
ST150176LC/LW	7	2000		50.1 GB	1 MB or 4 MB	7200 RPM	Ultra2 WIDE SCSI	TCQ	512 bytes	50 Series	
ST1181677LW/LWV	7	2000		181.6 GB	4 MB (LW) 16 MB (LWV)	7200 RPM	Ultra160 SCSI	TCQ	512 bytes	180 Series	Series Manual
ST1181677LC/LCV	7	2000		181.6 GB	4 MB (LC) 16 MB (LCV)	7200 RPM	Ultra160 SCSI	TCQ	512 bytes	180 Series	Series Manual
ST318417N/W				18.4 GB	2 MB	7200 RPM			512 bytes	36ES Series	
ST318437LW/LC				18.4 GB	2 MB	7200 RPM			512 bytes	36ES Series	
ST336737LW/LC				36.9 GB	2 MB	7200 RPM			512 bytes	36ES Series	
ST318418N	8	2001		18.4 GB	2 MB	7200 RPM	Ultra20 SCSI	TCQ	512 bytes	36ES2 Series	Series Manual
ST318438LW	8	2001		18.4 GB	2 MB	7200 RPM	Ultra160 SCSI	TCQ	512 bytes	36ES2 Series	Series Manual
ST336918N	8	2001		36.9 GB	2 MB	7200 RPM	Ultra20 SCSI	TCQ	512 bytes	36ES2 Series	Series Manual
ST336938LW	8	2001		36.9 GB	2 MB	7200 RPM	Ultra160 SCSI	TCQ	512 bytes	36ES2 Series	Series Manual
ST318436LW				18.3 GB	2 MB	7200 RPM		TCQ	512 bytes	18XL Series	Series Manual
ST318436LC				18.3 GB	2 MB	7200 RPM		TCQ	512 bytes	18XL Series	Series Manual
ST318436LWV				18.3 GB	4 MB	7200 RPM		TCQ	512 bytes	18XL Series	Series Manual
ST318436LCV				18.3 GB	4 MB	7200 RPM		TCQ	512 bytes	18XL Series	Series Manual
ST318426LW				18.3 GB	1 MB	7200 RPM		TCQ	512 bytes	18XL Series	Series Manual
ST318426LC				18.3 GB	1 MB	7200 RPM		TCQ	512 bytes	18XL Series	Series Manual
ST318416N				18.3 GB	2 MB	7200 RPM		TCQ	512 bytes	18XL Series	Series Manual
ST39236LC				9.1 GB	2 MB	7200 RPM		TCQ	512 bytes	18XL Series	Series Manual
ST39236LWV				9.1 GB	4 MB	7200 RPM		TCQ	512 bytes	18XL Series	Series Manual
ST39236LCV				9.1 GB	4 MB	7200 RPM		TCQ	512 bytes	18XL Series	Series Manual
ST39226LW				9.1 GB	1 MB	7200 RPM		TCQ	512 bytes	18XL Series	Series Manual
ST39226LC				9.1 GB	1 MB	7200 RPM		TCQ	512 bytes	18XL Series	Series Manual
ST39216N				9.1 GB	2 MB	7200 RPM		TCQ	512 bytes	18XL Series	Series Manual
ST39216W				9.1 GB	2 MB	7200 RPM		TCQ	512 bytes	18XL Series	Series Manual

== ATA and SATA models ==
=== Barracuda ATA (1999) ===
Available in capacities between 6.8 GB and 28.2 GB, with a 512 KB cache buffer and an ATA/66 interface. This is the first model in the Barracuda family equipped with an ATA/IDE interface.

Barracuda ATA replaced Medalist Pro 6530/9140 drives, which were the world's first 7200 RPM ATA/IDE drives available on the market when launched in October 1997.

=== Barracuda ATA II (2000) ===
Available in capacities between 10 GB and 30 GB, with a 2 MB cache. Supports up to ATA/66 interface. Seagate announced launch of Barracuda ATA II on January 31, 2000.

=== Barracuda ATA III (2000) ===
Available in capacities between 10 GB and 40 GB, with a 2 MB cache. Supports up to ATA/100 interface. Some models even had optional fluid dynamic bearings which made the drive much quieter than ball bearing counterparts although not standard with ball bearings still being the default configuration at factory. The FDB models had significantly quieter idle operation and also noticeably quieter read/write operations too due to reduced vibration from the spindle bearings. Seagate announced launch of Barracuda ATA III on September 6, 2000.

=== Barracuda ATA IV (2001) ===
Available in capacities between 20 GB and 80 GB, with a 2 MB cache. Supports up to the ATA/100 interface. These drives operate very quietly as they are one of the first hard drives to exclusively use fluid dynamic bearings in their spindle motors and are significantly quieter in idle and also reads/writes. Furthermore, their seek times were slowed in firmware to reduce noise output via Automatic Acoustic Management(AAM) despite the ATA III being the first to include AAM.

These disks cannot operate reliably at ATA/100 on RCC/ServerWorks IDE controllers, as their drivers blacklist the disks, thus limiting their operation to ATA/66.

Barracuda ATA IV was the first generation of Barracuda ATA drives to be available exclusively with fluid dynamic bearings in spindle motors. Seagate announced their launch on June 27, 2001.

=== Barracuda ATA V/ATA V Plus/Serial ATA V (2002) ===
Available in capacities between 30 GB (60 GB for SATA models) to 120 GB, with 2 MB cache (8 MB in SATA models), with either ATA/100 and SATA/150 interfaces. Barracuda V with SATA port is one of the first hard drives to feature a SATA interface.

The SATA models have many problems, including random data loss (such as disappearing partitions). These disks cannot work with some Silicon Image SATA controllers, as their drivers blacklist the disks and limit the maximum sectors of each transaction below 8 KB (15 sectors), leading to considerably reduced performance.

Seagate announced launch of Barracuda ATA V on June 24, 2002.

=== Barracuda 7200.7/7200.7 Plus (2002–2003) ===
Available in capacities between 40 GB and 200 GB, with ATA/100 and SATA interface options. The drives have 2 MB (marketed as Barracuda 7200.7) or 8 MB (marketed as Barracuda 7200.7 Plus) of cache, depending on the model. Seagate announced launch of Barracuda 7200.7 family on December 2, 2002 with 80 GB platters and capacities up to 160 GB. Raised capacities up to 200 GB using 100 GB platters became available in September 2003. SATA models were first launched without NCQ feature, NCQ models were added to offer in 2004 (models ST380817AS, ST3120827AS and ST3160827AS, capacities between 80 and 160 GB; non-NCQ models are ST380013AS, ST3120026AS and ST3160023AS).

A budget version of Barracuda 7200.7, marketed as U Series 9, with 1 MB of cache and different actuator mechanism, became available exclusively to OEMs in early 2003. They were available exclusively with ATA/100 interface. Produced capacities were 80, 120 and 160 GB.

=== Barracuda 7200.8 (2004) ===
Available in capacities between 200 GB and 400 GB, with either an ATA/100 or SATA interface with NCQ, these were sold alongside the 7200.7 series, providing higher capacities than the 7200.7. The drives have 8 MB or 16 MB of cache, depending on the model. It was the first generation of Barracuda drives to offer 16 MB of cache. Starting from Barracuda 7200.8 all SATA models are shipped with NCQ feature. Seagate announced launch of Barracuda 7200.8 on June 14, 2004.

=== Barracuda 7200.9 (2005) ===
Available in capacities between 40 GB and 500 GB, with either ATA/100 or SATA 3 Gbit/s interfaces and 2 MB, 8 MB or 16 MB of cache, depending on the model. It was the last Barracuda generation to be using older and increasingly outdated longitudinal magnetic recording (LMR) which has areal density limitations. All SATA models were available with new 3 Gbit/s interface (1,5 Gbit/s mode is available via jumper). Seagate announced launch of Barracuda 7200.9 on June 8, 2005.

Certain models of Barracuda 7200.9 drives were also available under Maxtor brand, the model name under this brand was DiamondMax 20. It was the oldest generation of Barracuda drives to be also offered under Maxtor brand after its acquisition by Seagate have been completed in 2006; model numbers of Maxtor-branded variants are identical as of Seagate ones but begin with STM letters.

=== Barracuda 7200.10 (2006) ===
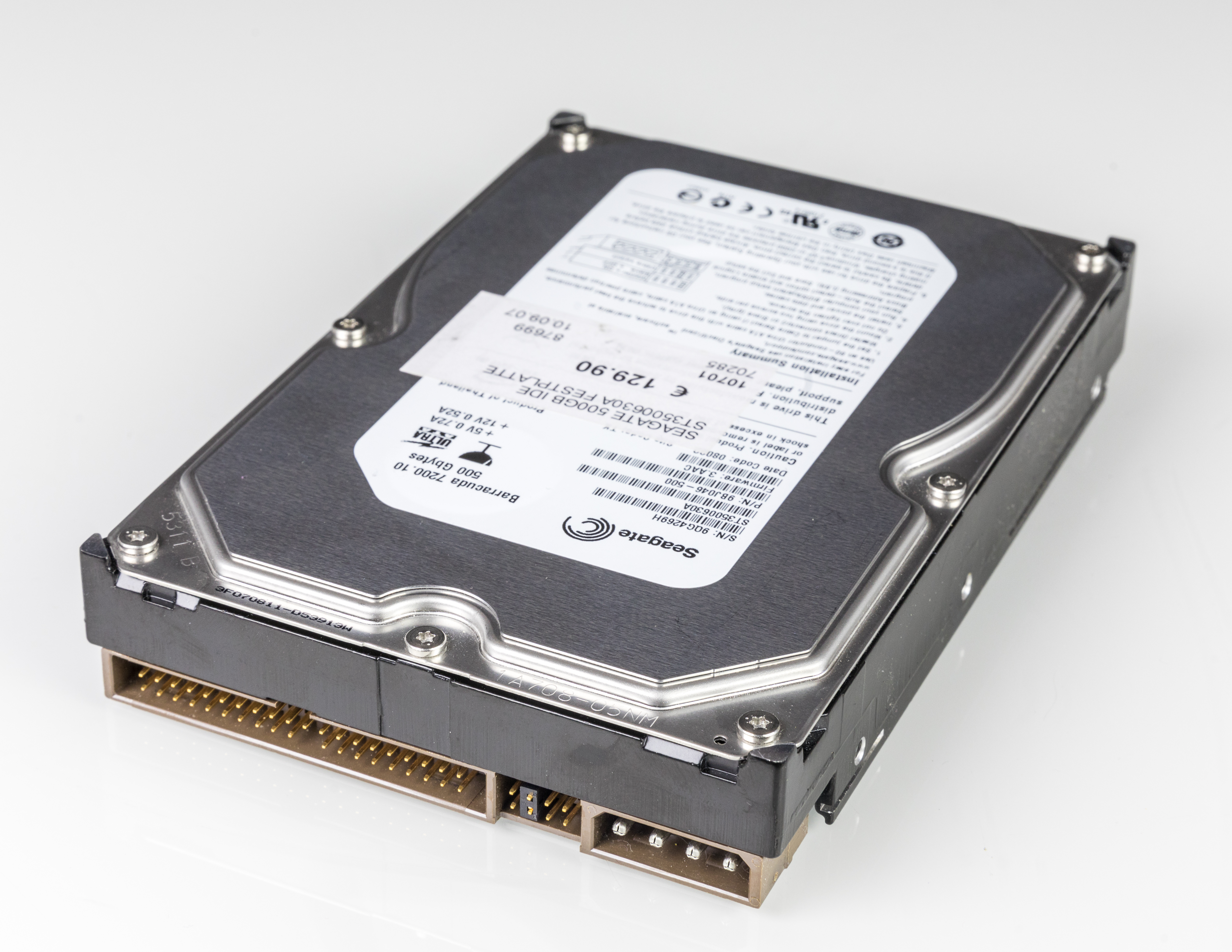
Seagate Barracuda 7200.10 ST3500630A, 500 GB, ATA/100

Available in capacities between 80 GB to 750 GB and either an ATA/100 or SATA 3 Gbit/s interface. 2, 8 or 16 MB of cache, depending on the model. This was the first Seagate hard drive to use perpendicular magnetic recording (PMR) technology (notably in 250 GB SATA models: ST3250410AS with 16 MB of cache and ST3250310AS with 8 MB of cache leading to 250GB per platter).All lower and higher capacities (320-750 GB also use PMR). Seagate announced launch of Barracuda 7200.10 on April 26, 2006. 250 GB PMR models were launched on June 7, 2007.

This is the last generation of Barracuda to feature IDE/PATA interface on certain models. This is the only generation of Barracuda to feature 750 GB as the greatest in storage limit of IDE drive ever made by any manufacturer. Industry's competitors ended development of IDE hard drives on lower capacities: Hitachi (despite having plans to offer 750 GB and 1 TB IDE drives which were eventually never produced and released), Maxtor (before its acquisition by Seagate) and Western Digital ended on 500 GB and Samsung ended on 400 GB.

Barracuda 7200.10 drives were also available under Maxtor brand, the model name under this brand was DiamondMax 21.

==== Firmware bug ====
The SATA models of this family with firmware 3.AAK [codename GALAXY] or older (e.g. 3.AAE[codename TONKA]) have introduced a firmware bug:

- There is a performance anomaly using hdparm with an NCQ queue depth of 31 in AHCI mode. Speed test measures only 55–64 MB/s (expected: >70–75 MB/s).

Seagate does not officially provide firmware updates for this issue; however, an unofficial firmware update (3.AAM) exists for the following drive models:

- ST3320820AS with part number 9BJ13G-308,
- ST3320620AS with part number 9BJ14G-308 (with firmware 3.AAK),
- ST3500830AS with part number 9BJ136-308 and
- ST3500630AS with part number 9BJ146-308.

=== Barracuda ES (2006) ===
Available in capacities between 250 GB to 750 GB, with SATA 3 Gbit/s interface and 8 or 16 MB of cache depending on model. The ES (Enterprise Storage) family were high-reliability drives based on Barracuda 7200.10 design. Despite being based on the 7200.10 it had no IDE options and SATA was the only interface offered. Intended for business-critical use, with all drives having a 5-year warranty and designed for 24/7 operation. Barracuda ES series replaced previous NL35 series (based on 7200.8) and NL35.2 series (based on 7200.9) enterprise drives. Seagate announced launch of Barracuda ES on June 7, 2006.

=== Barracuda 7200.11 (2007) ===
With a SATA 3 Gbit/s interface, capacities range from 160 GB to 1.5 TB. All models now use Perpendicular recording as standard. The first Barracuda generation to exclusively offer SATA and discontinue IDE options. Codenames are Moose (earlier revision, using 250 GB platters) and Brinks (later revision, using 333 and 375 GB platters). Their cache size can be 8 MB, 16 MB or 32 MB, depending on the drive model. Seagate announced launch of Barracuda 7200.11, along with Barracuda ES.2, on June 25, 2007. They were also available under Maxtor brand, the model name under this brand was DiamondMax 22. 7200.11 was based off the Moose platform(most) and brinks (notably the 1.5TB model, 1TB model with 3 platters and 320gb slim 20mm model). Moose in particular suffered reliability issues from firmware in early production. Brinks had fewer issues in later models but many people saw 7200.11 as unreliable regardless.

Alongside normally retailed models, a 2 TB version (model number ST32000540AS) was produced in 2009 which, while being marked on the label as Barracuda 7200.11, was actually a pre-production series of Barracuda XT drives, installed in certain models of FreeAgent, Expansion and BlackArmor external drives. It uses the same mechanical design (codenamed Muskie) as the 2 TB Barracuda XT(ramp loading) and is unrelated to all other Barracuda 7200.11 models which use Contact Start Stop parking on inner platter and a different HDA. Notable are also missing various international safety marks.

==== Firmware bug ====
This family has introduced many severe firmware bugs:

1. Disks may not show and utilize all the cache.
2. FLUSH_CACHE commands may time out when NCQ is used.
3. There is a performance anomaly using hdparm with NCQ queue depth 31 in AHCI mode. Speed test measures only 45–50 MB/s (expected: > 100–110 MB/s).
4. Disks may be inaccessible at power on.

Disks affected by the last bug will not be detected by the computer BIOS after a reboot. Numerous users have complained about this and are discussing it in a public forum when discussions in Seagate's forums were subjected to heavy moderation and subsequently closed. The symptom of the problem is that the computer BIOS will no longer detect the hard disk after a reboot, and upon connecting to the hard disk with a serial TTL board, this error code will be seen as "LED:000000CC FAddr:0024A051." Faulty firmware triggers this "failure."

Seagate FreeAgent external drives have also utilized 7200.11 hard disks with the SDxx firmware, and failures of these hard drives were also reported. The access LED remains permanently on, despite being disconnected from USB and no longer being recognized by the computer. However, Seagate says that the LED light remaining permanently on had nothing to do with firmware problems. The drives have also become known for their unusually high failure rates, including sudden mechanical failures; the rapid development of large numbers of bad sectors; the motherboard detecting the drive as a different model and the drive regularly "freezing" when being read from or written to.

Other companies have claimed to be able to resolve this problem using their own solution, namely Ace Laboratory PC3000-UDMA (version 4.13).

In order to fix the first bug, Seagate released firmware update AD14 for the affected disk models; to fix the second, third and fourth bugs, Seagate released firmware updates SD1A, SD1B, SD2B and SD81. The SD2B firmware update for Brinks removes the DCO ATA feature from the disks, while SD1A for Moose adds two ATA features.

=== Barracuda ES.2 (2007) ===
Available in capacities between 250 GB (500 GB for SAS models) and 1 TB, 16 MB cache for SAS models and a 32 MB cache for SATA 3 Gbit/s models. Enterprise-grade drives based on 7200.11 series. SAS models were the first Barracuda drives with server-grade interface since the discontinuation of Barracuda 180 in 2004.

==== Firmware bugs ====
Similar to the 7200.11 family, this family has introduced many firmware bugs, which was fixed by SN06 firmware released by Seagate:

- RAID arrays using these disks may fail.
- Secure Erase command is not handled properly.
- There is a performance anomaly using hdparm with NCQ queue depth 31 in AHCI mode. Speed test measures only 50 MB/s (expected: >100 MB/s).
- Disks may be inaccessible at power on.

Barracuda ES.2 is currently the last product in Seagate's enterprise line to bear the "Barracuda" name. The successor of ES.2, launched in early 2013, is branded as "Constellation ES.3" which is based on the design of 14th-generation Barracuda.

=== Barracuda 7200.12 (2009) ===
Available in capacities between 160 GB to 1 TB. Initial models (CCxx firmware) supported up to SATA 3 Gbit/s, while later revisions (firmware JCxx) support the newer SATA 6 Gbit/s interface. Their cache size can be 8 MB, 16 MB or 32 MB, depending on the drive model. Uses 500 GB platters. Power consumption is reduced from previous models, resulting in lower heat dissipation and claimed reliability improvements from better firmware and mechanical engineering. The 7200.12 faired significantly better in reliability compared to its predecessor with a very low annual failure rate of 0.39%. Seagate announced launch of Barracuda 7200.12 on January 5, 2009. SATA 6 Gbit/s models replaced SATA 3 Gbit/s models in January 2011. Improved in relaibility over the previous 7200.11 generation. Based on the new pharaoh platform codename.

Barracuda 7200.12 drives were also available under the Maxtor brand, the model name under this brand was DiamondMax 23. Only SATA 3 Gbit/s models were available under the Maxtor brand and was the last generation of DiamondMax drives produced. Seagate phased out the Maxtor brand in October 2009, reviving it in 2016 for their external hard drive lineup.

=== Barracuda XT, LP and Green (13th generation) (2009/10) ===
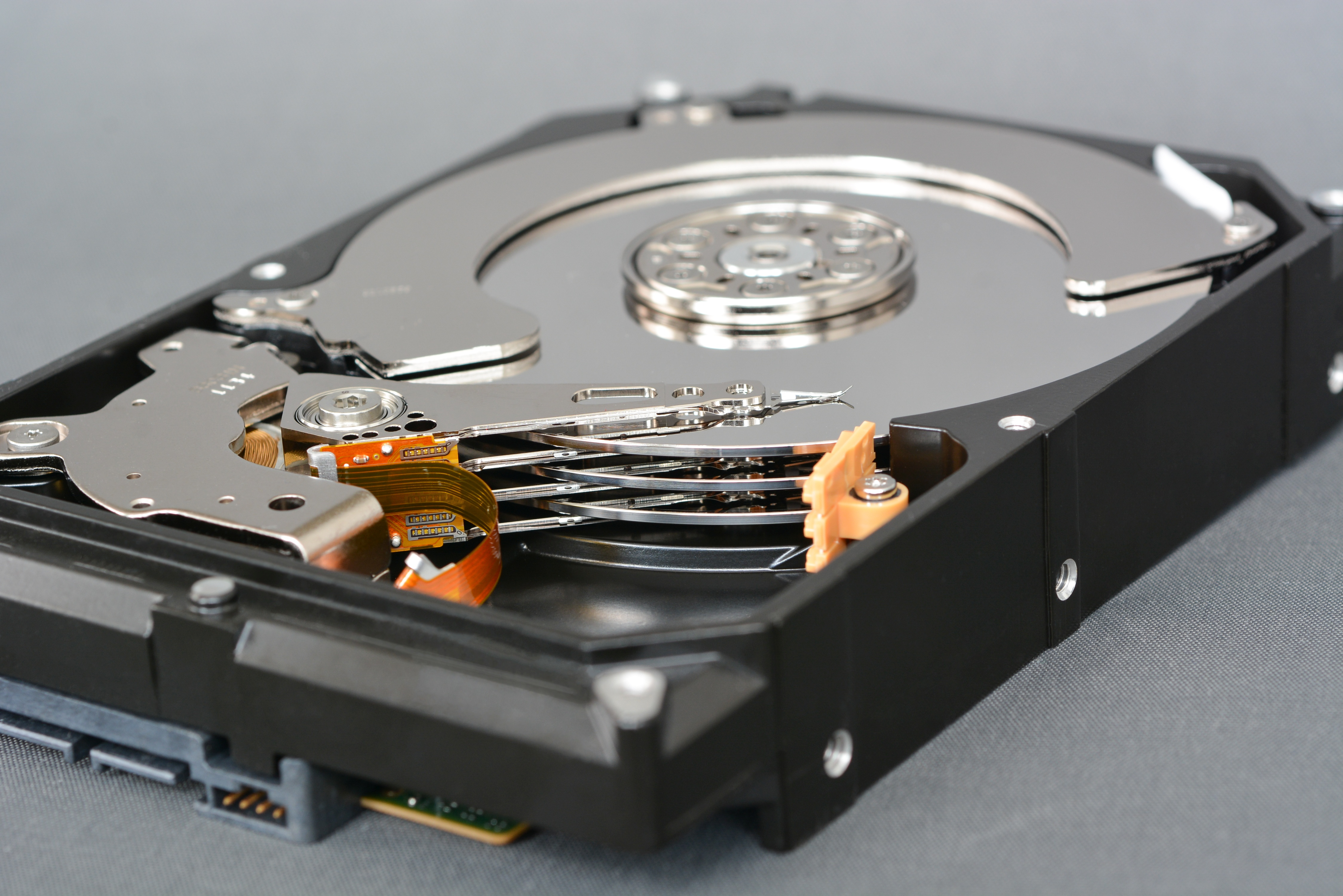
Hard disk Seagate Barracuda 1500 GB, 3.5 inch, capacity 1.5 TB, built 2011. The head unload ramp is the orange plastic piece on the right edge of the drive.

Available in capacities between 2 TB and 3 TB (XT) with 64 MB cache, 1 TB and 2 TB (LP) with 16 MB or 32 MB cache, 1 TB, 1.5 TB and 2 TB (Green) with 16 MB to 64 MB cache depending on model. This is the first Barracuda series to support SATA 6 Gbit/s and its buffer size is 64 MB. Rotation speed is 7,200 RPM for XT, and 5,900 RPM for LP and Green.

Barracuda XT was launched on September 21, 2009.

Barracuda XT is intended for high-performance gaming computers and workstations with sustained data transfer rate of 149 MB/s. LP is designated for mass storage applications favoring low heat output, quiet operation and better-than-average energy efficiency.

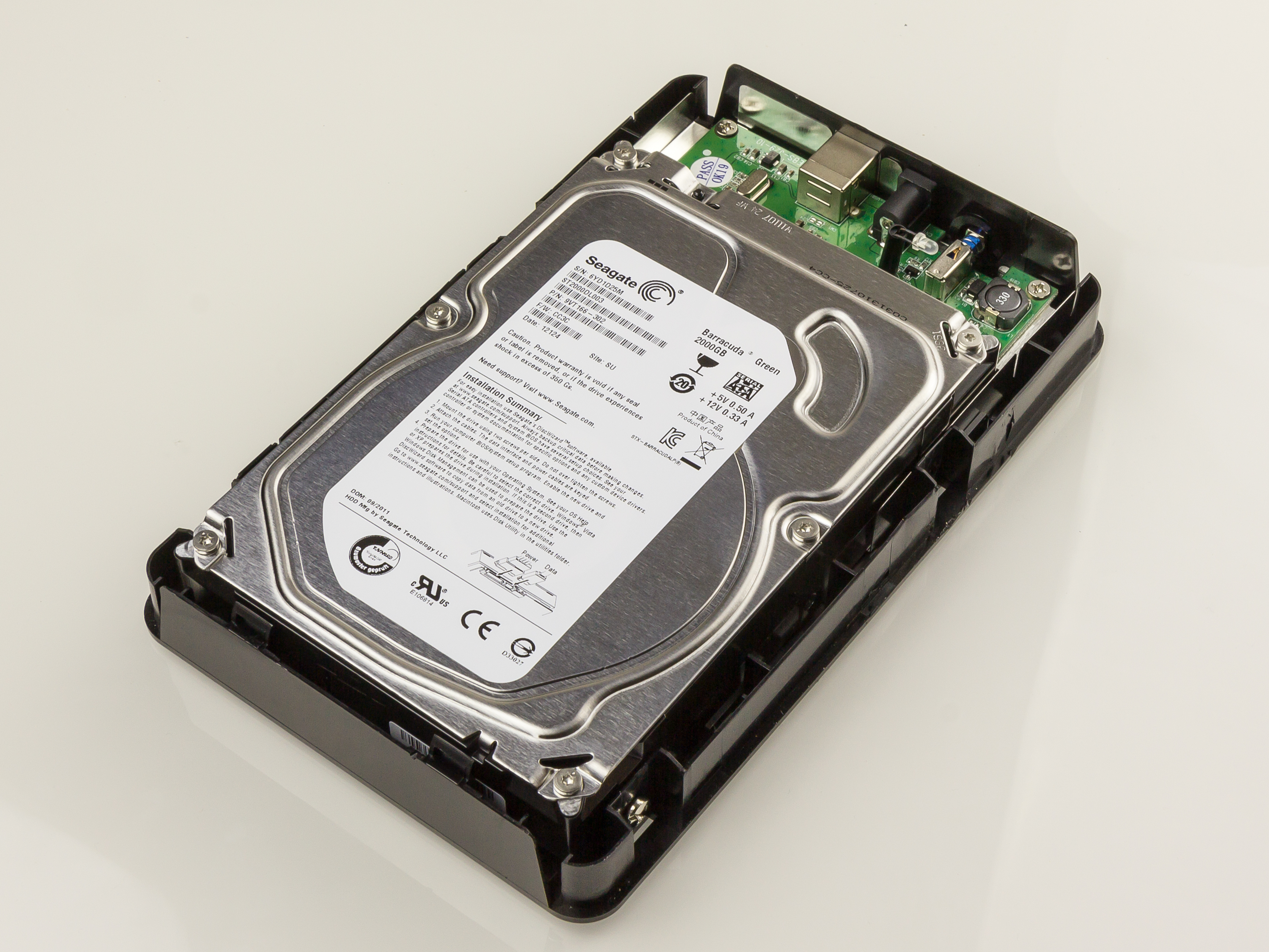
Barracuda Green 2000 GB (ST2000DL003)

The Barracuda Green series was introduced in December 2010 as a high-performance, eco-friendly, low-power internal drive, replacing the Barracuda LP series. It is the first to use Advanced Format sectors and operates at 5900 RPM.

Barracuda XT used re-engineered mechanical design, which featured, for the first time in desktop hard drives from Seagate, a head unload ramp, a feature shared with Western Digital, Toshiba, and HGST drives at the time that keeps the heads from ever having to touch the platters and drastically improving the rated start/stop cycle count. The same design was later re-used in Seagate's enterprise hard drives. Original Barracuda LP models used the same mechanical design as used in Barracuda 7200.11 drives, later ones (and Green models), like XT, also used re-engineered mechanical design, but was different. It was later re-used in 14th generation of Barracuda drives.

==== Firmware bugs ====
The Barracuda LP series also present firmware issues that might be alleviated by the latest firmware available on the Seagate web site (CC35), although there are reports that drives with the CC35 firmware loaded continue to exhibit the same problems as earlier firmware releases. The most commonly referred issue with the Barracuda LP series drives appears to be one variation or another of the infamous click of death problem; the drive will start to emit a regular clicking noise at some point in its early life (possibly even at first start) and after some time will fail altogether, often after a few months of use. While the clicking noise is emitted, the hard drive is inaccessible and may prevent the BIOS from detecting it.

There is also a CC95 firmware (at least some of those drives came as part of external Seagate FreeAgent drives), but it is not clear whether this build fixes all known issues, and why firmware versions between CC35 and CC95 do not seem to exist.

=== Barracuda (14th generation) (2012) ===
Available in capacities between 250 GB to 3 TB, 7200 RPM, 16 MB to 64 MB cache, depending on the model. First Seagate hard drives with 1 TB per platter technology (500, 320 and 250GB models still used a single 500GB platter). From this generation onwards, Seagate phased out previous "green" models, citing the inherent power saving functions featured on the 14th generation removed the need for a separate low-power design. One model in particular the 3TB, ST3000DM001, is notable for its very high failure rate of around 40% compared to other drives and models 250GB-2TB with 250-500GB models being the most reliable due to being based off the older stable pharaoh platform from the 7200.12 line, however the 3TB was especially bad as this model very frequently experienced bad sector growth and head crashes due to mechanical defects in manufacturing. The ST3000DM001 is widely known as one of the worst hard disk drives ever made for its extremely high failure rate and even resulted in a class action lawsuit being even worse than the 7200.11 failures. The cause was a faulty head parking ramp.

=== BarraCuda (16th generation) (2016) ===
The successor of the 14th generation Barracuda, branded as "Desktop HDD", was a 5,900 RPM series launched in early 2013 and was not considered part of the Barracuda line (revived in 2016 as “BarraCuda”). The ‘Desktop HDD’ line was available from 250GB to 8TB. They performed slightly worse due to their lower RPM compared to the barracuda.14 series. Some Desktop HDD models even used SMR but the vast majority used CMR. The original 2016 launch BarraCudas all used CMR technology especially the older 2-8TB models that used CMR until 2019/2020.

"Barracuda" name made a comeback in 2016, stylized by Seagate as BarraCuda. Available in capacities between 500 GB to 8 TB. Buffer sizes vary from 32 MB for 500 GB and 1 TB models to 256 MB for 3 TB to 8 TB units. Currently listed BarraCuda drives mostly use shingled magnetic recording (SMR) technology to write data onto platters, and spin up at 5400 RPM (exception is model ST2000DM008, which spins up at 7200 RPM while utilizing SMR technology). 500 GB and 1 TB models still use perpendicular magnetic recording technology and spin at 7200 RPM, but they also do not feature load/unload ramps, instead using contact start/stop technology which is an older technology where the heads park on a landing zone on the platters to reduce costs compared to park ramps.

=== BarraCuda Pro (2016) ===
Available in capacities between 2 TB and 14 TB. Launched alongside BarraCuda, it is described as "Perfect for high performance desktop, creative pro desktop applications, and gaming". This series has higher read/write performance than standard BarraCuda drives; one PCWorld review noted its consistent read speed throughout its entire capacity, which is unusual for a conventional HDD. The BarrCuda pro series was discontinued in 2021 by Seagate and a successor is planned to take its place.

While 2 and 4 TB models feature 128 MB of cache, all other capacities feature 256 MB of cache. Capacities from 8 TB are helium-sealed drives, while lower ones (including 8 TB model ST8000DM005) are air-sealed. All models spin up at 7200 RPM, have 512 bytes per sector and write data onto platter using perpendicular magnetic recording technology.

=== BarraCuda Compute (16th generation, 2016-Present) ===
Released in October 2016 BarraCuda Compute available in 2.5" and 3.5" versions. With capacities from 500 GB to 5 TB for 2.5" versions and 1 TB (500 GB no longer for sale) to 8 TB for 3.5" ones. Some 2.5” models are available in both 5400 and 7200rpm: 500GB-2TB models. All 2.5" have 128 MB cache size, 3.5" mostly have 256 MB with two exceptions 1 TB (64 MB cache) and 500 GB (32 MB cache). Moreover, only these two (500GB discontinued) are using CMR recording technology rest uses SMR. Each 3.5" has 4096 Bytes sectors size, in 2.5" there is distinction between 512 Bytes logical sectors size and 4096 Bytes physical sector sizes. The 3.5” 500gb BarraCuda drives are discontinued as of late 2024 due to declining demand for lower capacity HDDs. The 1TB model is the lowest capacity likely for 3.5 drive models. The 1Tb 3.5” models using CMR technology are ST1000DM010(released 2016) also interestingly uses Contact start stop technology in parking the heads instead of load unload ramps to reduce costs, but it is not a major disadvantage due to the non-mobile nature of 3.5 drives. All 2.5 models use SMR which can be slower especially for heavy writes.

Note: There is mismatch in few details about this Seagate HDD series. Few sources have different release date etc. 7th October 2016 is date when Seagate released media kit for their 2.5" BarraCuda products and day after they released for 3.5".

In late 2025 Seagate introduced helium filled BarraCudas (16-24TB). The 1TB CMR model (ST1000DM010) based on the older CSS Pharaoh Oasis platform is still in production for OEM use and contracts, the SMR based ST1000DM014 V15 platform replaced it for general retail but the CMR 1TB BarraCuda (still in production) still is available in grey market channels through liquidators of OEM hardware who then sell these to consumers from unwanted bulk. The 16-24TB models use HAMR CMR. Seagate kept the 2-8TB models the same with only minor revisions (V11 to V15 SMR platform).

== Warranty length ==
Depending on the type of product and where it was purchased, the warranty period may be as short as 1 year or as long as 5 years.

== See also ==
- Seagate SeaShield
