= Disk failure =

In computing, disk failure usually refers to the failure of a disk-based storage device, including:

- Floppy disk failure
- Hard disk drive failure

== See also ==
- Fault-tolerant system
- RAID
- Data redundancy
- Disaster recovery
- Data recovery
- Data loss

== Not to be confused with ==
- Slipped disk, a medical condition of a spine
