= Internal hard drive defect management =

Internal hard drive defect management is a system present in hard drives for handling of bad sectors. The systems are generally proprietary and vary from manufacturer to manufacturer, but typically consist of a "P" (for "permanent" or "primary") list of bad sectors detected in the manufacturing stage and a "G" (for "growth") list of bad sectors that crop up after manufacturing. Many disk/controller subsystems reserve storage to remap defective disk sectors. The drive automatically creates its initial remapping information and has the additional ability to dynamically remap "grown" defects. Because the drive is remapping its own bad sectors, software may not detect growing numbers of bad sectors until later stages of gradual hard-disk failure (which in some cases may not be until after the warranty period has expired.)
