= Deskstar =

Line of computer hard disk drives

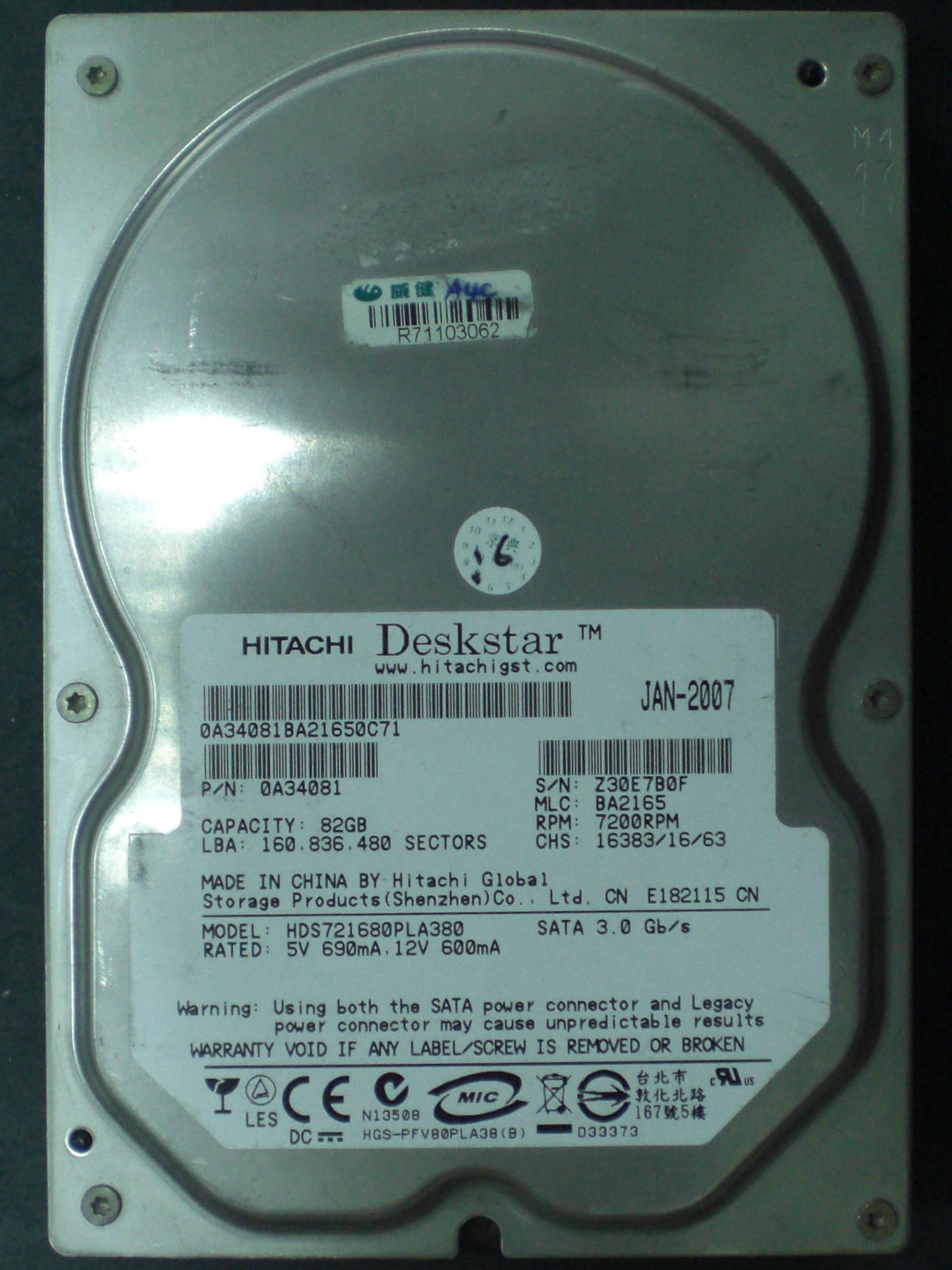
An 82GB Hitachi Deskstar hard disk.

Deskstar was the name of a product line of computer hard disk drives. It was originally announced by IBM in October 1994. The line was continued by Hitachi, when in 2003 it bought IBM's hard disk drive division and renamed it Hitachi Global Storage Technologies. In 2012, Hitachi sold the division to Western Digital, who continued the drive product line brand as HGST Deskstar. In 2018, Western Digital began winding down the HGST brand, and as of 2020 it is defunct.

The first Deskstar product produced by IBM was the DALA-3540, with a capacity of 541 decimal megabytes or 516 binary megabytes; the last was the 180GXP. HGST continued the product line after the acquisition, selling the Deskstar 120GXP and Deskstar 180GXP under the HGST brand for a short time and selling new models thereafter.

The unreliable IBM Deskstar 75GXP product became notorious as the "Deathstar" (only one of at least twenty IBM products in the Deskstar family).

== Products ==
A list of Deskstar models, including all those manufactured by IBM and HGST while under Hitachi's management.

=== IBM models ===
- Deskstar DALA-3540
- Deskstar DALS-3540 (SCSI)
- Deskstar DJAA-31270/31700
- Deskstar DSAA-3270/3360/3540/3720
- Deskstar DSAS-3270/3360/3540/3720 (SCSI)
- Deskstar XP
- Deskstar 3
- Deskstar 4
- Deskstar 5
- Deskstar 8
- Deskstar 14GXP
- Deskstar 16GP
- Deskstar 22GXP
- Deskstar 25GP
- Deskstar 34GXP
- Deskstar 37GP
- Deskstar 40GV
- Deskstar 75GXP
- Deskstar 60GXP
- Deskstar 120GXP
- Deskstar 180GXP

=== HGST models under Hitachi management ===
- Deskstar 60GXP
- Deskstar 120GXP
- Deskstar 180GXP
- Deskstar 7K80
- Deskstar 7K160
- Deskstar 7K250
- Deskstar T7K250
- Deskstar 7K400
- Deskstar 7K500
- Deskstar E7K500
- Deskstar T7K500
- Deskstar 7K1000
- Deskstar P7K500
- Deskstar 7K1000.B
- Deskstar E7K1000
- Deskstar 7K2000
- Deskstar 7K1000.C
- Deskstar 5K1000
- Deskstar 7K3000
- Deskstar 5K3000
- Deskstar 5K1000.B
- Deskstar 7K1000.D
- Deskstar 5K4000
- Deskstar 7K4000

=== HGST models under WD management ===
The nine current models in production at WD's acquisition of HGST continued to be offered. The Deskstar 7K1000.C was the last model offered by HGST.

== IBM Deskstar 75GXP failures ==
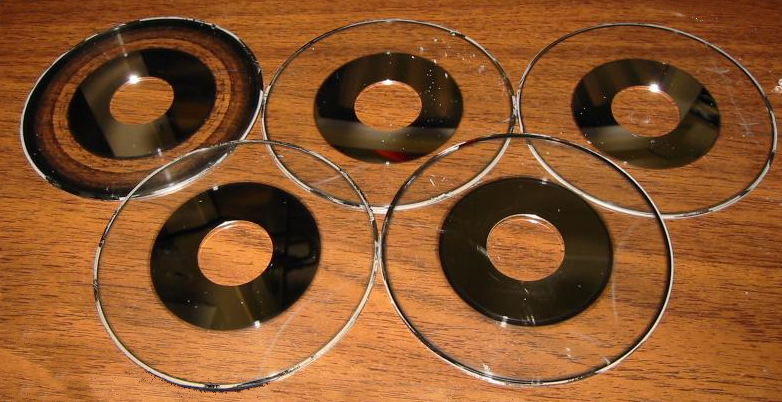
Five disks removed from a dead IBM Deskstar 75GXP which failed in a server at the University of Florida in April 2003. Ten heads crashed so severely that almost all the magnetic media was removed from the flying part of the disks' surfaces revealing the transparent glass substrates. One disk in the upper left has some magnetic material on a portion of the head flying region.

The IBM Deskstar 75GXP (six models ranging in capacity from 15 to 75 GB) became infamous circa 2001 for their reportedly high failure rates, which led to the drives being colloquially referred to as "Deathstar". Due to this, the drives were ranked 18th in PC World's "Worst Tech Products of All Time" feature in 2006.

=== Lawsuit ===
Despite failures being reported within the manufacturer warranty period of three years, Michael T. Granito, Jr., an American user of IBM's 75GXP hard drives, filed a class-action lawsuit against IBM on 16 October 2001 for defects in the product causing it to "crash", with both of the drives he had bought having failed within a short time. IBM was found to have misled its customers about the reliability of the drives. Without admitting responsibility, they settled this lawsuit in 2005, agreeing to pay US$100 (equivalent to $164.85 in 2025) to every user whose Deskstar 75GXP drives had failed. The settlement related to the following family of IBM Deskstar 75GXP HDD models: DTLA-307015; DTLA-307020; DTLA-307030; DTLA -307045; DTLA-307060; DTLA-307075.

=== Details ===
The drives were known for an unusually high rate of head crashes, due to the magnetic coating soon beginning to loosen and sprinkle off from the platters, creating dust in the hard disk array and leading to crashes over large areas of the platters. The combination of two technologies, giant magnetoresistant heads on 3.5-inch (89 mm) glass platters, are said to be largely to blame for the issues.

A firmware update introduced wear leveling which avoids the heads dwelling too long over the same area thereby reducing the potential for head crashes. The same firmware update also fixed a possible data corruption due to a problem with Self-Monitoring, Analysis and Reporting Technology background operations.

=== Aftermath ===
After the filing of the lawsuit, IBM unveiled the Deskstar 120GXP, and the Travelstar 60GH and 40GN on November 7, 2001.

== See also ==
- Travelstar – Brand of hard disk drive
- Ultrastar (hard disk drive) – Brand of hard disk drives by Western Digital
