= Travelstar =

Brand of hard disk drive

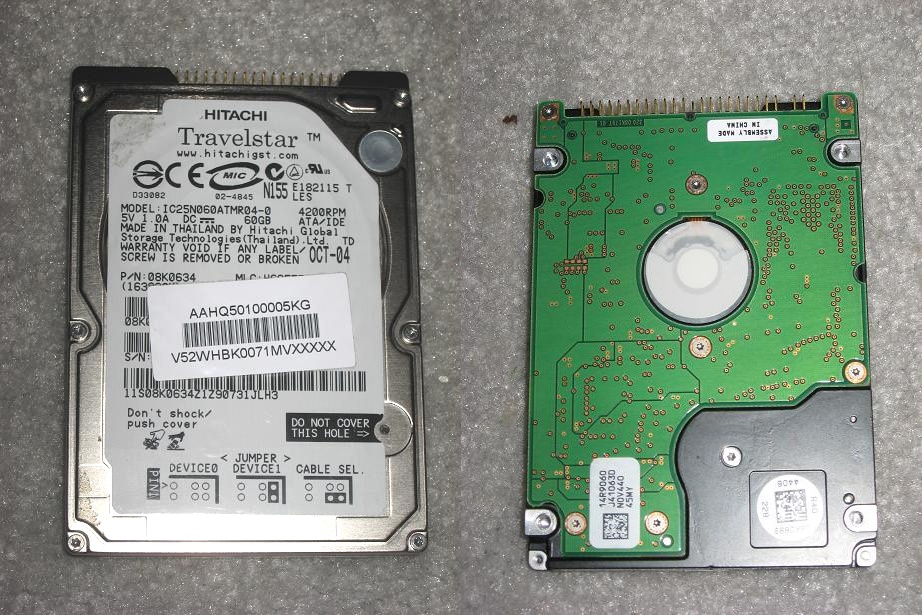
A Hitachi Travelstar 80GN 60GB hard drive (front and back)

Travelstar is a brand of discontinued 2.5-inch hard disk drive (HDD) that was introduced by IBM in 1994 with the announcement of the Travelstar LP. At 12.5 mm high with two platters, they were available in 360, 540 and 720 MB capacities. Initial models were industry-leading for small form factor HDDs in terms of areal density (644 Mb/in^{2}), data transfer rates (11.1 MB/sec) and shock tolerance (500g).

These drives were typically used with laptop computers and small form factor desktop computers. Models were manufactured with capacities up to 1 TB, with rotational speeds of 5400 rpm or 7200 rpm and in 7 mm or 9.5 mm package heights. Older models were offered with the Parallel ATA interface and some in a 1.8" form factor. In 1990 IBM began shipping 2.5-inch HDDs without this branding. Newer Travelstar drives were manufactured with the Serial ATA interface.

The brand was adopted and renamed to "HGST Travelstar" by Hitachi Global Storage Technologies after they acquired IBM's HDD business in 2003 and continued for a while after HGST's 2.5-inch drive plant in Thailand, Toshiba Storage Device Co. Ltd., was acquired by Western Digital in 2012, but the HGST prefix is now defunct.

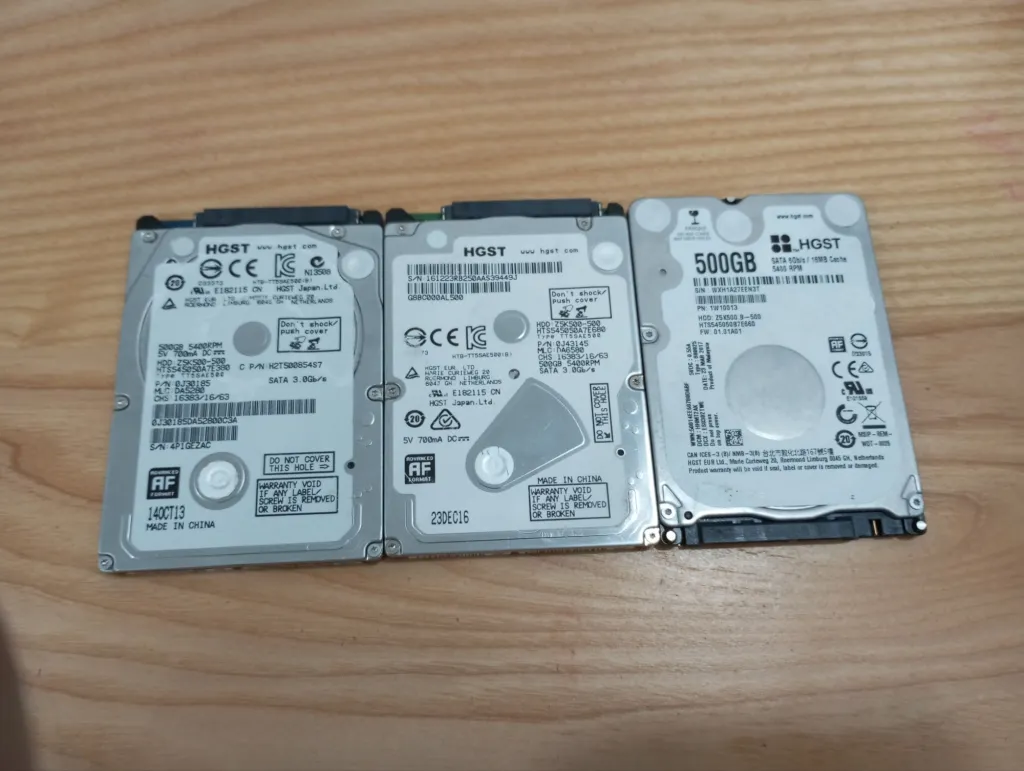
Left to right: HGST HTS545050A7E380, HTS545050A7E680, HTS545050B7E660. All 3 drives are part of the Travelstar Z5K500 family

The Travelstar Z5K500 and Z7K500, announced in 2012, had a z-height of 7mm, 1 platter and 2 heads. The Z5K500 and Z7K500 had drive capacities of 250, 320, and 500GB capacities and 8,16 and 32MB of cache with a speed of 5400 or 7200 RPM. Western Digital later "updated" the line by rebranding a WD Blue drive to the Z5K500.B and WD Black to Z7K500.B, the Z5K500.B can only be configured with 16 MB cache while the Z7K500.B is only available with 32MB cache.

In 2017 Western Digital released the Z5K1, a 7mm 1TB hard drive that is the only HGST drive to ever feature drive-managed SMR. As of 2024 this drive is no longer offered for sale by Western Digital.

== See also ==
- Deskstar
- Ultrastar
