= Ultrastar (hard disk drive) =

Brand of hard disk drives by Western Digital

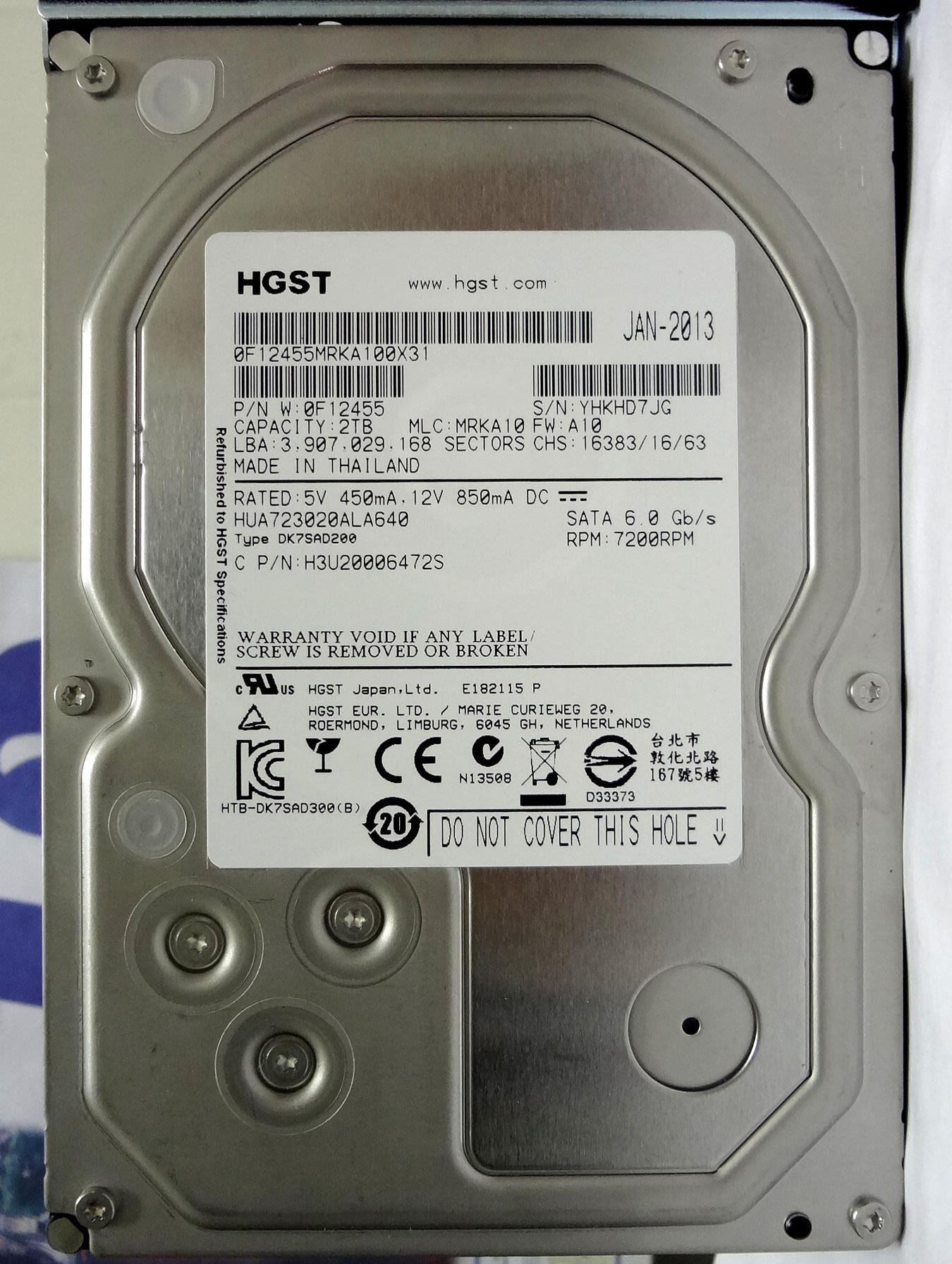
2 TB HGST (now WD) Ultrastar

Ultrastar is a Western Digital brand of enterprise-class high performance 3.5-inch hard disk drives (HDDs) and solid-state drives (SSDs) and formerly 10000 and 15000RPM 2.5/3.5 mission critical enterprise drives.

== History ==
The brand was originally introduced by IBM in 1994 for enterprise-level HDDs together with home-computing oriented Deskstar models. These drives were based on revolutionary metalized glass disk technology. In 2003 IBM's HDD business was acquired by Hitachi, reorganized as Hitachi Global Storage Technologies (HGST) which was sold, splitting the business between Western Digital and Toshiba in 2012. The part acquired by Western Digital has retained the "HGST Ultrastar" brand name. Western Digital continued using the HGST prefix on product labels, slowly phasing it out. This resulted with some models being sold under both HGST and WD branding simultaneously (e.g. the HGST Ultrastar He10 and WD Ultrastar HC510 are the same models of HDD).

These drives are typically used with enterprise computer systems. The two 1994 models, the 10.8 GB Ultrastar2 and the 8.7 GB Ultrastar2 XP, were offered with a variety of interfaces including Fast SCSI, Fast-Wide SCSI, SCA 80-pin connectors, and Serial Storage Architecture. Evaluations units were available in the third quarter of 1995.

HDD models are offered with capacities up to 28 TB and with SATA or SAS interfaces. SSD models are offered with capacities up to 61.44 TB and with SATA and NVMe interface.

== See also ==
- Deskstar
- Travelstar
