= Sudden motion sensor =

Hard drive protection on Apple devices

The sudden motion sensor (SMS) is a type of active hard-drive protection used in Apple's notebook computers for the protection of their internal hard disk drives. First appearing on the 2005 refresh of PowerBooks, it has since been present on all subsequent models, including the MacBooks, until its retirement in 2012.

With a triaxial accelerometer, the shock detector detects sudden acceleration, such as when the computer is dropped, and prepares the relatively fragile hard disk drive mechanism for impact. The system disengages the disk drive heads from the hard disk platters, preventing data loss and drive damage from a disk head crash. When the computer is stable, the drive operates normally again. A clicking noise can be heard when the sudden motion sensor activates.

Following MacBooks' switch to using solid-state drives (SSDs) as data storage, the SMS became unnecessary and was retired. Since SSDs do not have any moving parts and are less susceptible to mechanical shock, they can continue working as normal as the device impacts the ground. The last MacBook with an HDD was released in 2012.

Broadly speaking, there have been two types of sudden motion sensor. The sensor used in the G4-based laptops resolved shifts of 1/52 g (e.g. the dynamic range was close to 6-bit, 64 scale divisions), while the sensor used in the later Intel-based Macs have an 8-bit resolution (256 scale divisions). In at least one model of Intel-based laptop, the MacBook Pro 15", Apple uses the Kionix KXM52-1050 three-axis accelerometer chip, with dynamic range of +/- 2g and bandwidth up to 1.5 kHz. Accelerometers are present in modern, SSD-based Macbooks as well, for usage other than protecting drives.

== Aftermarket hardware problems ==
Among the MacBook and MacBook Pro community there have been several owners who installed aftermarket hard drives already equipped with anti-shock features who reported experiencing kernel panic errors whenever their unit was physically moved. This is believed to be due to a conflict between SMS and the new drive's anti-shock function. The Western Digital Scorpio series of notebook hard drives have been the most frequently reported as being susceptible to this problem. In practically all cases, disabling SMS alleviated this problem without any negative performance impact.

== See also ==
- Active hard-drive protection
