= Active hard-drive protection =

In computer hardware, active hard-drive protection refers to technology that attempts to avoid or reduce mechanical damage to hard disk drives by preparing the disk prior to impact. This approach is mainly used in laptop computers that are frequently carried around and more prone to impacts than desktop computers.

== Implementation ==
Usually, the system consists of accelerometers that alert the system when excess acceleration or vibration is detected. The software then tells the hard disk drive to unload its heads to prevent them from coming in contact with the platters, thus potentially preventing a head crash.

Many laptop vendors have implemented this technology under different names. Some hard-disk drives also include this technology, needing no cooperation from the system.

== See also ==
- Hard disk drive failure
- Head crash
- Sudden Motion Sensor
