= Seagate SeaShield =

Physical electrostatic protection shield

SeaShield unmounted

Seagate SeaShield was a physical electrostatic protection shield feature of Seagate Medalist series hard drives, and followed by the Barracuda series of hard disk drives.

== Physical characteristics ==
There are two types of Sea Shield:

The first version of the shield is made of two pieces. The top is made of metal and serves as physical protection for the electronics. The other half is mounted on the bottom side of hard drive, and is fastened with a metal hook to the electronics board with two Torx screws. The metal shield covers the electronic circuit and electronic cables leading to the hard disk drive motor and drive head. Below the metal shield, there is a layer of foam, which serves as the actual electrostatic protection. The metal shield is covered with a plastic label, which contains instructions on disk installation, and various physical jumper setups.

SeaShield mounted on a hard drive, in default configuration.

== External resources ==
- Seagate Barracuda SATA V Review https://web.archive.org/web/20020918012352/http://www.lostcircuits.com/advice/sata150/10.shtml
- Russian Baracuda SATA Review http://www.composter.ru/Environ/wa/Main?textid=3792&level1=articles
- WiebeTech Misc Products and Accessories (with pricing) http://www.wiebetech.com/products/misc.php
