= Annualized failure rate =

Probability that a device or component will fail during a year of use

Annualized failure rate (AFR) gives the estimated probability that a device or component will fail during a full year of use. It is a relation between the mean time between failure (MTBF) and the hours that a number of devices are run per year. AFR is estimated from a sample of like components—AFR and MTBF as given by vendors are population statistics that can not predict the behaviour of an individual unit.

== Hard disk drives ==
For example, AFR is used to characterize the reliability of hard disk drives.

The relationship between AFR and MTBF (in hours) is:

$$\mbox{AFR} = 1-\exp(-8766/\mbox{MTBF})$$

This equation assumes that the device or component is powered on for the full 8766 hours of a year, and gives the estimated fraction of an original sample of devices or components that will fail in one year, or, equivalently, 1 − AFR is the fraction of devices or components that will show no failures over a year. It is based on an exponential failure distribution (see failure rate for a full derivation). Note: Some manufacturers count a year as 8760 hours.

This ratio can be approximated by, assuming a small AFR,

$$\mbox{AFR} = {8766 \over \mbox{MTBF}}$$

For example, a common specification for PATA and SATA drives may be an MTBF of 300,000 hours, giving an approximate theoretical 2.92% annualized failure rate i.e. a 2.92% chance that a given drive will fail during a year of use.

The AFR for a drive is derived from time-to-fail data from a reliability-demonstration test (RDT).

AFR will increase towards and beyond the end of the service life of a device or component. Google's 2007 study found, based on a large field sample of drives, that actual AFRs for individual drives ranged from 1.7% for first year drives to over 8.6% for three-year-old drives. A CMU 2007 study showed an estimated 3% mean AFR over 1–5 years based on replacement logs for a large sample of drives.

== See also ==
- Failure rate
- Frequency of exceedance
