= HGST =

Computer storage device manufacturer

HGST, Inc.
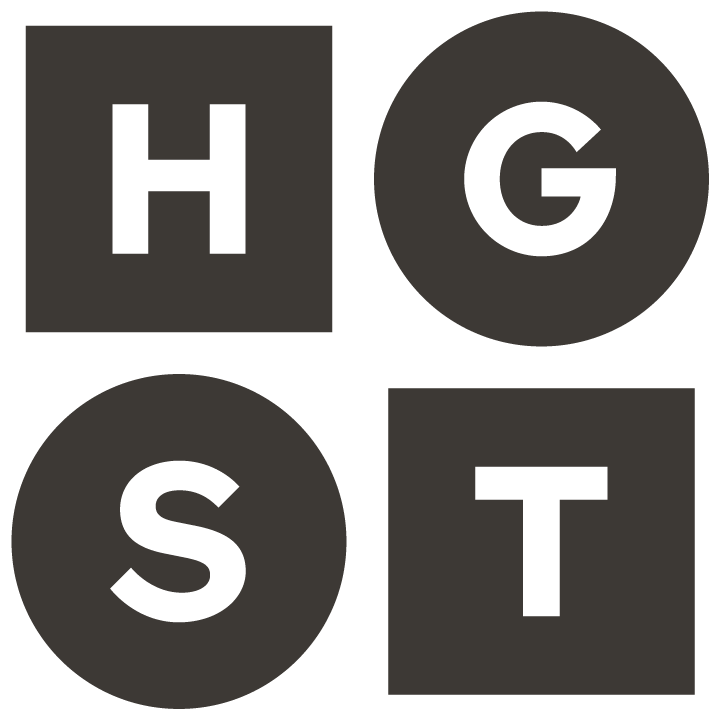
- Industry: Computer storage devices
- Predecessor: IBM's hard drive business
- Founded: 2003; 23 years ago
- Defunct: 2018; 8 years ago
- Fate: Acquired by Western Digital in 2012; brand phased out in 2018
- Headquarters: San Jose, United States
- Area served: Worldwide
- Key people: Mike Cordano (President)
- Products: Hard disk drives solid-state drives external storage devices
- Number of employees: 45,000
- Website: http://www.hgst.com/

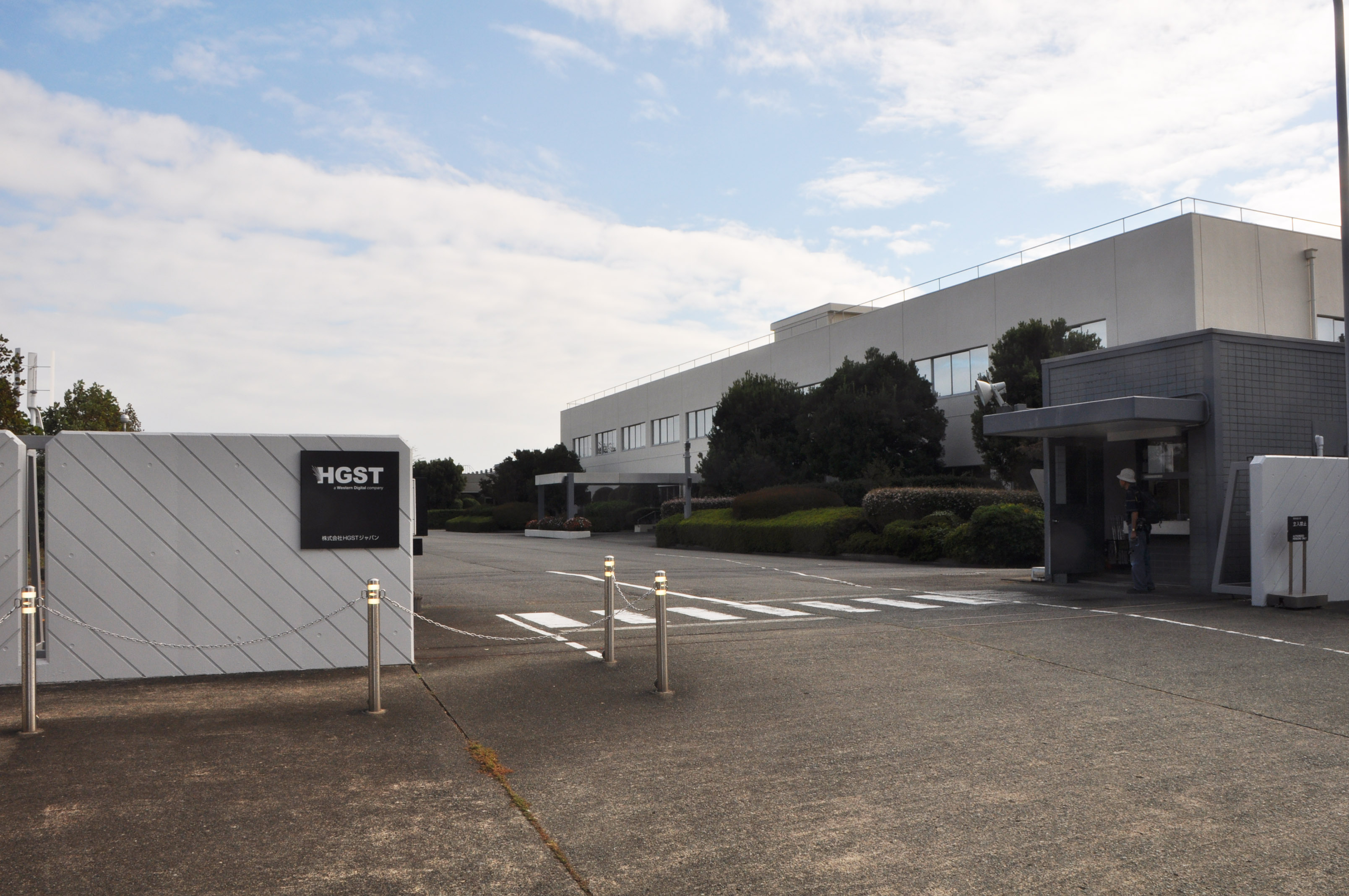
HGST's Fujisawa plant, expanded from IBM's Fujisawa plant

HGST, Inc. (Hitachi Global Storage Technologies) was a manufacturer of hard disk drives, solid-state drives, and external storage products and services.

It was initially a subsidiary of Hitachi, formed through its acquisition of IBM's disk drive business. It was acquired by Western Digital in 2012. However, until October 2015, it was required to operate autonomously from the remainder of the company due to conditions imposed by Chinese regulators. Chinese regulators later permitted Western Digital to begin wider integration of HGST into its main business. By 2018, the HGST brand had been phased out, with its remaining products now marketed under the Western Digital name.

== History ==
Hitachi Global Storage Technologies was founded on January 6, 2003, as a merger of the hard disk drive businesses of IBM and Hitachi. Hitachi paid IBM US$2.05 billion for its HDD business.

On March 8, 2012, Western Digital (WD) acquired Hitachi Global Storage Technologies for $3.9 billion in cash and 25 million shares of WD common stock valued at approximately $900 million. The deal resulted in Hitachi, Ltd. owning approximately 10 percent of WD shares outstanding, and reserving the right to designate two individuals to the board of directors of WD. Citing antitrust concerns, China's Ministry of Commerce required HGST to operate autonomously from Western Digital, restricting outright integration between the companies' operations. As a result, HGST continued to operate independently with its own product lines and product development.

As part of the deal, Western Digital agreed to trade assets with Toshiba, with Toshiba receiving assets for the production of 3.5-inch hard drives (1, 2 and 3-platter drives produced in Shenzhen, China), in exchange for a Toshiba factory in Thailand for producing 2.5-inch drives (which had been inactive since the 2011 floods).

In November 2013, HGST announced a 6 TB capacity drive filled with helium. In September 2014, the company announced a 10 TB helium drive, which uses shingled magnetic recording to improve density.

In October 2015, the Chinese Ministry of Commerce issued a decision allowing Western Digital to begin integrating HGST into its main business. WD was required to maintain the HGST brand and sale team for at least two more years. Since then, first WD-branded products left HGST's plant at 304 Industrial Park in Prachinburi Province, Thailand; in reverse, certain HGST-branded products became produced at Western Digital's plants in Bang Pa-in District, Ayutthaya Province, Thailand and Penang, Malaysia. In 2018, Western Digital announced that it was phasing out its HGST brand and that all of its remaining product lines (particularly Ultrastar) will henceforth be marketed as brands of Western Digital.

== Products ==
=== Hard drives and solid-state drives ===
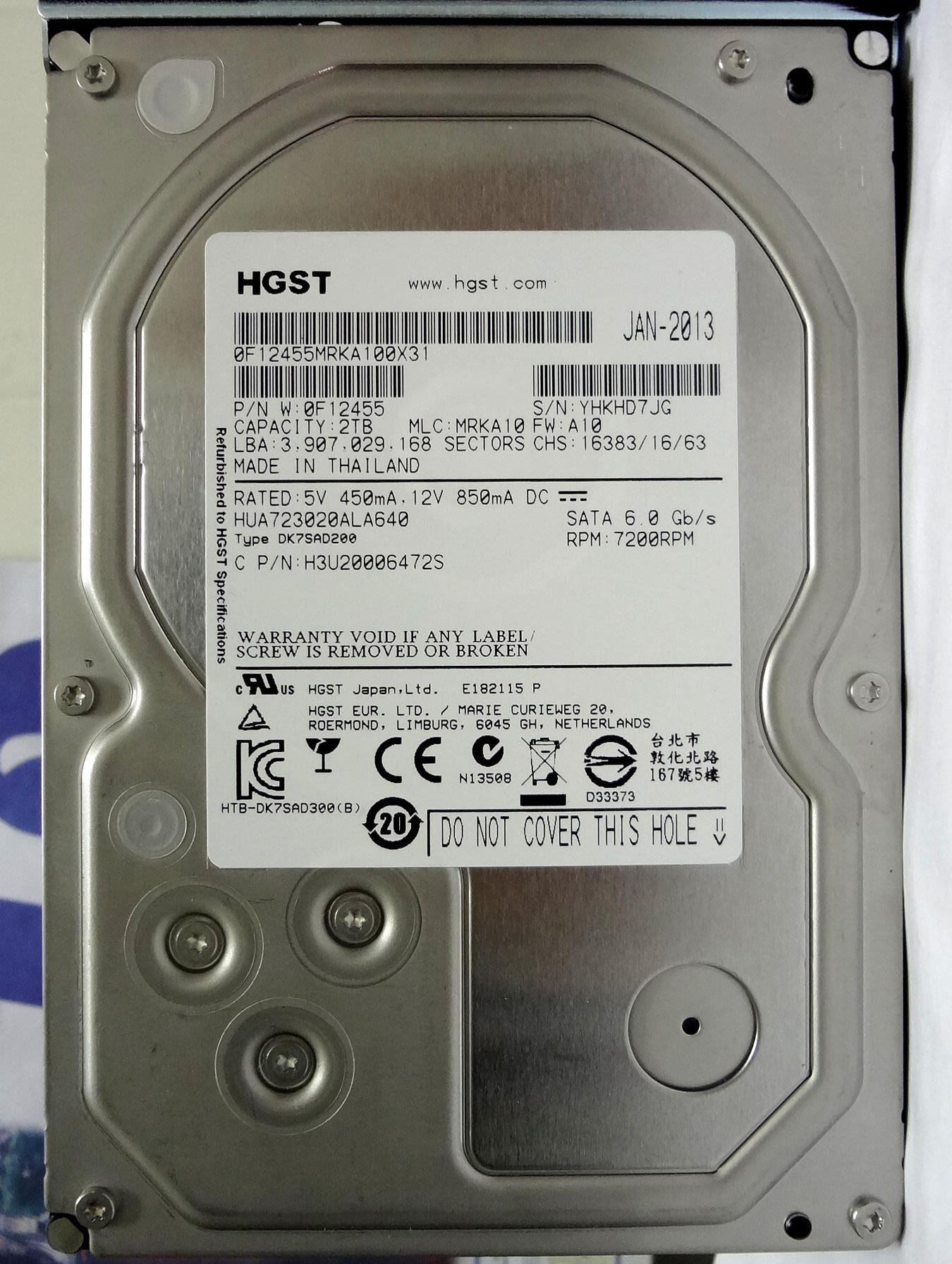
Ultrastar HUA723020ALA640

- Ultrastar – Enterprise-class line of 3.5-inch and 2.5-inch HDDs with SCSI, Fibre Channel, SAS, and SATA interfaces; and a line of 3.5-inch and 2.5-inch Fibre Channel, SAS and PCIe NVMe SSDs. Now marketed under Western Digital brand.
- Deskstar – Desktop-class line in 3.5-inch form factor with SATA interfaces. Phased out after discontinuation of HGST brand. Western Digital-branded successors are 3.5-inch variants of WD Blue and Black HDDs, and for Deskstar NAS drives also WD Red.
- Travelstar – Mobile-class line in 2.5-inch form factor with SATA interfaces. Phased out after discontinuation of HGST brand. Western Digital-branded successors are 2.5-inch variants of WD Blue and Black HDDs.
- Endurastar – Ruggedized line in 2.5-inch form factor with PATA or SATA interfaces, primarily for automotive applications. Phased out after discontinuation of HGST brand.
- CinemaStar – 3.5-inch and 2.5-inch form factors, optimized for consumer electronics applications requiring quiet operation and AV streaming commands support. Phased out after discontinuation of HGST brand. Western Digital-branded successors are WD Purple and AV.

=== External storage ===
- LifeStudio products, announced in 2010 but now discontinued, were external hard drives that combine photo organization software, a 3D Wall for displaying content, a connected USB Flash key.
- G-Technology external storage products, acquired in 2009, are sold to Apple Macintosh communities, including users of multimedia content such as Final Cut Pro digital audio/video production professionals. Now rebranded as SanDisk Professional.
- Touro family of cloud storage backup products.

== See also ==
- Hitachi-LG Data Storage (HLDS) – joint venture of Hitachi and LG; manufacturer of DVD and Blu-ray drives.
- Hitachi Data Systems (HDS) – manufacturer of modular enterprise storage systems, software and services.
