= Head crash =

Read-write head of a hard disk making contact with the platter

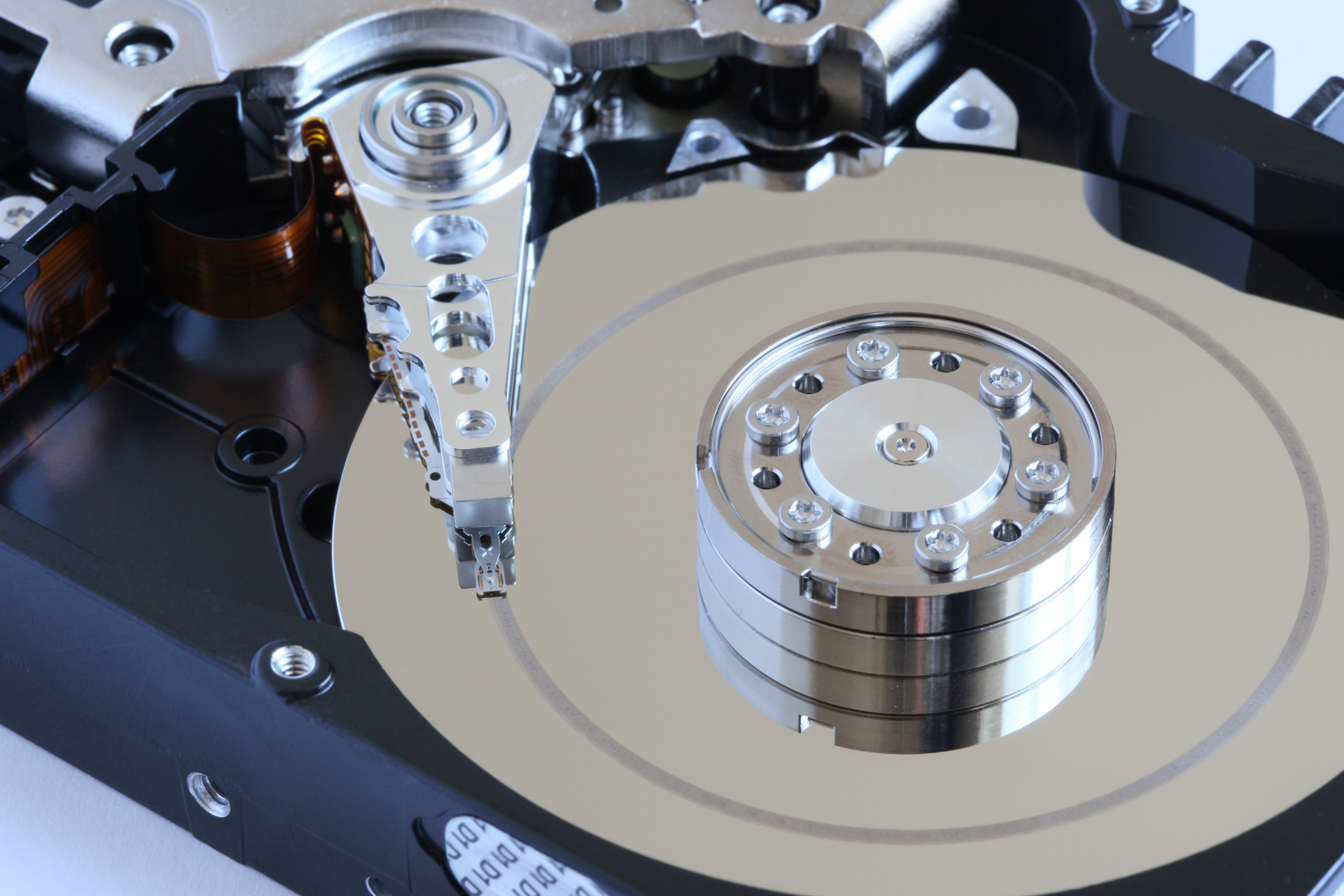
A head crash in a modern drive. Note circular scratch mark on the platter.

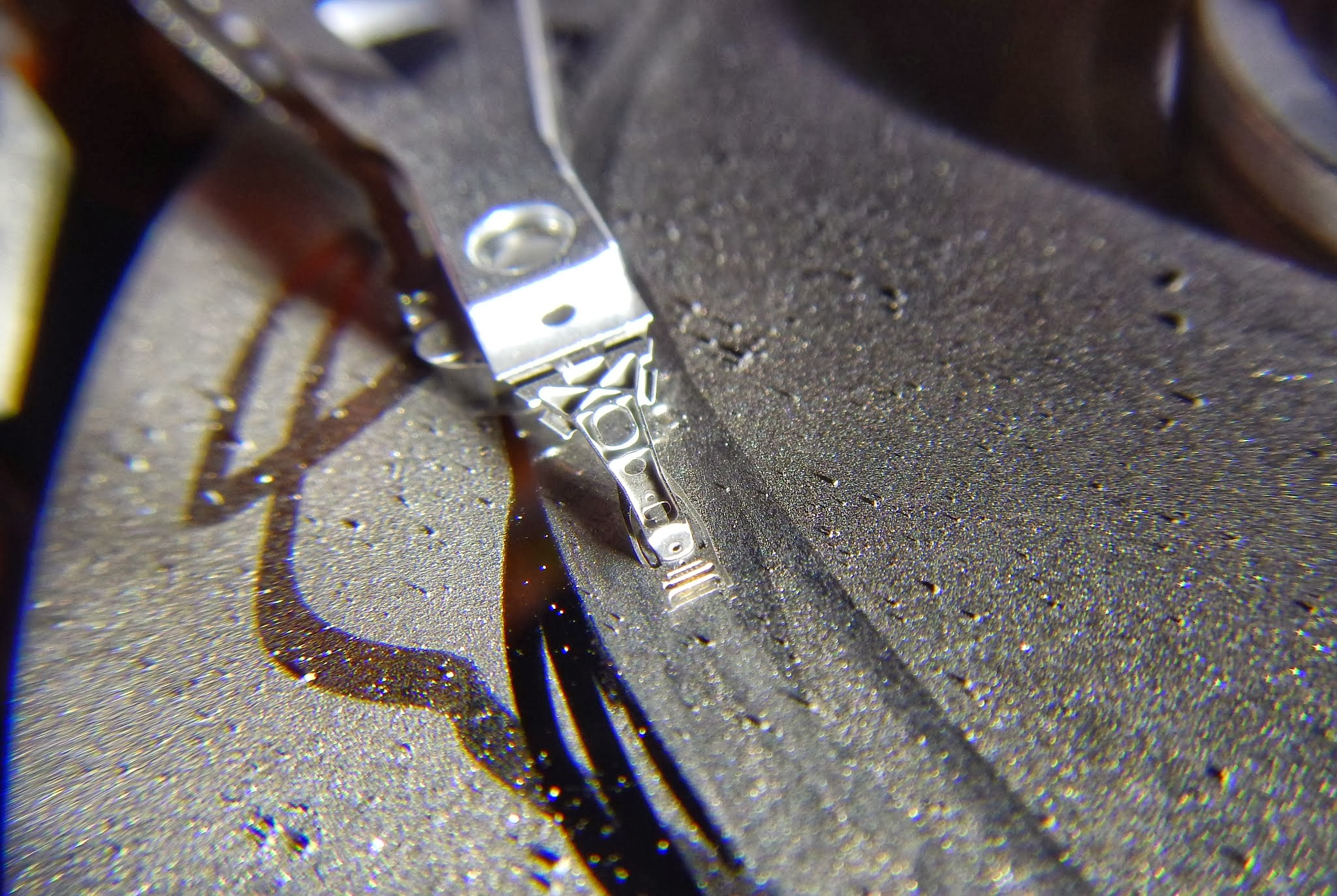
A head crash

A head crash is a hard-disk failure that occurs when a read–write head of a hard disk drive makes contact with its rotating platter, slashing its surface and permanently damaging its magnetic media. It is difficult to recover data from a head crashed drive. It is most often caused by a sudden severe motion of the disk, for example the jolt caused by dropping a laptop to the ground while it is operating or physically shocking a computer. Laptop 2.5" drives are significantly more likely to have a head crash due to their mobile nature, despite having higher shock resistance than 3.5" desktop drives. Desktop drives are larger and more prone to damage if dropped, but are typically employed in a stationary computer/server; overall, they are less likely to experience a head crash.

== Head details ==
A head normally rides on a thin film of moving air entrapped at the surface of its platter (some drives manufactured by Conner Peripherals in the mid-1990s used a thin liquid layer instead of air, and they were the only manufacturer to ever do this). The distance between the head and platter is called the flying height. The topmost layer of the platter is made of a Teflon-like material that acts like a lubricant. Underneath is a layer of sputtered carbon. These two layers protect the magnetic layer (data storage area) from most accidental touches of the read-write head.

The disk read-and-write head is made using thin film techniques that include materials hard enough to scratch through the protective layers. Heads must not touch the platters unless it is on a landing zone but modern hard drives use load ramps (a notable exception would be cheaper Seagate drives that still use landing zones) so the heads never touch at all. A head crash can be initiated by a force that puts enough pressure on the platters from the heads to scratch through to the magnetic storage layer. A tiny particle of dirt or other detritus, excessive shock or vibration (such as accidentally dropping a running drive), can cause a head to bounce against its disk, destroying the thin magnetic coating on the area the heads come in contact with, and often damaging the heads in the process. After this initial crash, a countless number of fine particles from the damaged area can land on other areas and can cause more head crashes when the heads move over those particles, quickly causing significant damage and data loss, and rendering the drive useless. Some modern hard disks incorporate free fall sensors (in 2.5 drives but very rare in 3.5 drives) to offer protection against head crashes caused by accidentally dropping the drive.

== Differences at RPMs ==
Since most modern drives spin at rates between 5,400 and 15,000 RPM, the damage caused to the magnetic coating can be extensive. At 7,200 RPM, the edge of a 3.5inch platter is traveling at over 120 kilometres per hour (75 mph), and as the crashed head drags over the platter surface, the read-write head generally overheats, making the drive or at least parts of it unusable until the head cools down.

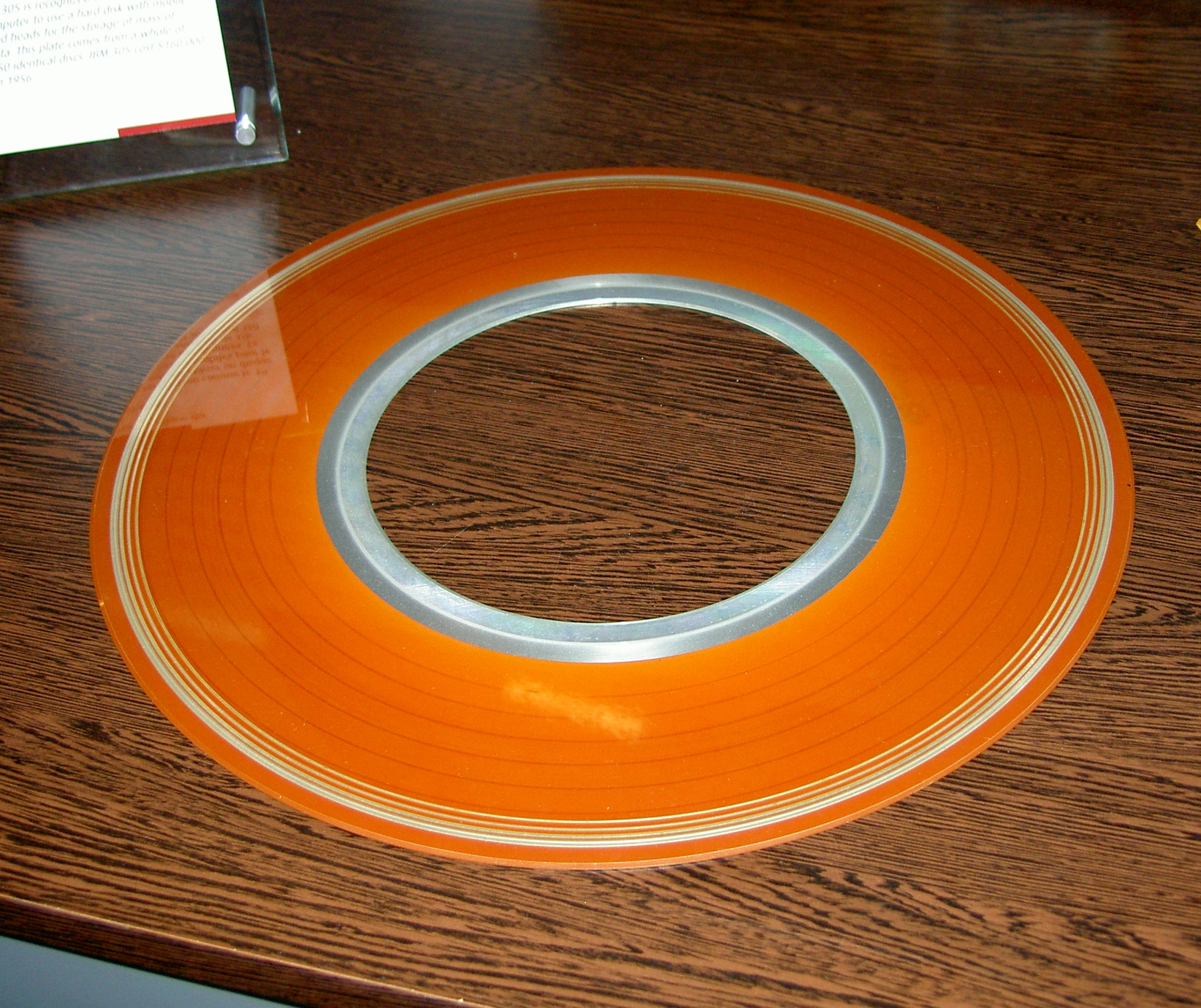
IBM RAMAC disk shows head crash damage.

== Older heads ==
Older drives typically rotated far more slowly and had larger heads flying higher above the surface of the medium. However, since in many cases, the medium was housed in a removable cartridge or pack and since air filtration was comparatively crude, crashes were fairly frequent and invariably expensive.

== Laptops ==
Head crashes have been a frequent problem on laptop computers since they first incorporated hard drives, since a laptop computer is more liable to be dropped or jostled than a stationary machine. This has led to the development of protective technologies that "park" the head at a safe distance from the disk when sudden motion, such as that of a dropped computer, is detected. Active Hard Disk Protection software and sensors began appearing in laptops in 2003 with IBM introducing it in their ThinkPad line of laptops, becoming common around 2009 with the introduction of Windows 7. These drives are also designed to "self-park" during sudden power loss, which has reduced the incidence of head crashes. With the popularization of solid-state drives, which have no head or disk, the head-crash issue has been nearly eliminated in modern laptops.

== See also ==
- Active hard-drive protection
- Bad sector
- Click of death
