= Flying height =

The flying height or floating height or head gap is the distance between the disk read/write head on a hard disk drive and the platter. The first commercial hard-disk drive, the IBM 305 RAMAC (1956), used forced air to maintain a 0.002 inch (51 μm) between the head and disk. The IBM 1301, introduced in 1961, was the first disk drive in which the head was attached to a "hydrodynamic air bearing slider," which generates its own cushion of pressurized air, allowing the slider and head to fly much closer, 0.00025 inches (6.35 μm) above the disk surface.

In 2011, the flying height in modern drives was a few nanometers (about 5 nm). Thus, the head can collide with even an obstruction as thin as a fingerprint or a particle of smoke. Despite the dangers of hard drive failure from such foreign objects, hard drives generally allow for ventilation (albeit through a filter) so that the air pressure within the drive can equalize with the air pressure outside. Because disk drives depend on the head floating on a cushion of air, they are not designed to operate in a vacuum. Regulation of flying height will become even more important in future high-capacity drives.

However, hermetically sealed enclosures are beginning to be adopted for hard drives filled with helium gas, with the first products launched in December 2015, starting with capacities of 10 TB.

== See also ==
- Head crash
