= David Thompson (engineer) =

American data storage engineer and inventor

David A. Thompson
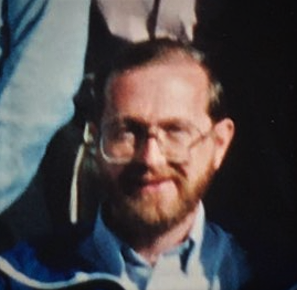
- Dave Thompson, 1990
- Born: December 17, 1940 (age 85); North Dakota, USA
- Education: Carnegie Institute of Technology
- Occupation: Engineer
- Employer: IBM
- Awards: IBM Fellow. 1980; Fellow Institute of Electrical and Electronics Engineers; Member National Academy of Engineering, 1988; IEEE Cledo Brunetti Award, 1992; Silicon Valley Hall of Fame, 1996; IEEE Magnetics Society Achievement Award, 1998; National Inventors Hall of Fame, 2012

David Allen Thompson is an American electrical engineer and inventor with a long career at IBM. He is noted for his many contributions to magnetic recording technology. Thompson was inducted into the National Inventors Hall of Fame for the invention and development of the thin-film inductive head and the magnetoresistive read head. These heads are now ubiquitous in all hard-disk drives and magnetic tape recorders.

== Contributions and significance ==
=== Thin-film inductive head ===
Before the commercialization of thin-film recording heads, the data storage industry used ferrite recording heads. A very important attribute of thin-film recording heads was the ability to fabricate such heads with photolithographic methods, which enabled far better dimensional precision than what had been possible with the cutting, grinding and polishing methods employed for making ferrite heads. Thin-film heads were first commercialized in 1980 in the IBM 3370.

=== Magnetoresistive read head ===
The most important value of the thin-film recording head was realized following invention and development of the magnetoresistive read head. This combination enabled the industry's first dual-element recording head, with a thin-film inductive element optimized for writing data overlaid with thin-film magnetoresistive element optimized for reading data. These heads were first commercialized in the IBM 3480 tape system in 1984 and in the IBM 9345 HDD in 1990.

=== Commercial impact ===
Thompson's innovations head technology have enabled and maintained the exponential increases in data storage areal-density (and decreasing cost per Byte) that have characterized tape-drives and hard disk drives for the last 50 years or more - sometimes referred to as Kryder's Law.

== Career details ==
In 1965, Thompson became an assistant professor of Electrical Engineering at Carnegie Institute of Technology. His research work was mainly in the areas of microwaves and magnetic thin films.

In 1968, Thompson joined the IBM Thomas J. Watson Research Center, Yorktown Heights, New York to join a team led by Hsu Chang. Thompson worked with Luby Romankiw and coauthored a key patent on the design of a thin-film inductive head that would go on to replace existing ferrite head technology. Chris Bajorek joined the team in 1971. The team had started looking at magnetoresistance and on sensors based on this effect. The first applications were related to reading data in bubble memory and on magnetic stripes. The latter did become a commercial success and hand-held card or stripe readers became widespread Subsequently, a major breakthrough occurred when Thompson and the team developed a practical magnetoresistive read head for magnetic recording. These shielded heads offered much higher signal-to-noise ratio than inductive heads and became ubiquitous in tape drives (first in the IBM 3480 in 1984) and then in hard disk drives(first in the IBM 9345 "Sawmill" in 1990). As a result of this work, in 1980, Thompson was named an IBM Fellow, the company's highest technical honor. Thompson was also designated an IBM Master Inventor

In 1987, Thompson moved to the IBM Almaden Research Center in San Jose, California to take up the role of Director of IBM Magnetic Recording Institute (originally established by Denis Mee). where he became director of the IBM Advanced Magnetic Recording Laboratory and director of the IBM Compact Storage Laboratory. These merged in 1991, to form the Advanced Magnetic Recording Laboratory (AMRL) which Thompson then headed.

Thompson has been an active member and supporter of the IEEE Magnetics Society. He served a term as president 1993-4 He was also conference chairman of the first Magnetic Recording Conference (TMRC 1991). Thompson was also a founding member of the Technical Advisory Board of the Magnetics Technology Centre (became Data Storage Institute) at the National University of Singapore. He also served on the advisory board of the Data Storage Systems Center (DSSC) at Carnegie Mellon University.

Thompson is author or coauthor on numerous patents and scientific papers. These are focused particularly on novel designs for thin-film write and read heads and read heads for magnetic recording. He was also known for his prognostications on the future of magnetic recording.

== Awards and recognition ==
Thompson has received numerous awards and recognition for his work in the field of magnetic recording:

- In 1980, Thompson was promoted to IBM Fellow, the highest technical honor in IBM
- In 198?, Thompson became a Fellow of the Institute of Electrical and Electronics Engineers
- In 1988, Thompson became a Member of the National Academy of Engineering.
- In 1992, Thompson received the IEEE Cledo Brunetti Award from IEEE President Merrill Buckley for "pioneering work in miniature magnetic devices for data storage including the invention design, and development of thin-film and magnetoresistive recording heads”. This is an IEEE Field award presented for "outstanding contributions to nanotechnology and miniaturization in the electronics arts". Contemporary recipients for work in magnetic recording include Robert Fontana and Shun-ichi Iwasaki.
- In 1993, Thompson received the Inventor of the Year Award from the New York State Patent, Trademark and Copyright Law Association, Inc.
- In 1995, Thompson received an Alumni Achievement (Merit) Award from Carnegie Mellon University
- In 1996, Thompson was inducted into the Silicon Valley Engineering Council Hall of Fame as a "pioneer in the design and development of thin film and magnetoresistive (MR) recording heads, which have enabled enormous increases in the capacity of data storage devices".
- In 1998, Thompson received the IEEE Magnetics Society Achievement Award presented at a ceremony at Intermag '99 in Gyeongju. This is the highest award presented by the IEEE Magnetics Society and is given for scientific and technical achievements. Contemporary recipients (colleagues and collaborators) include John Slonczewski, John Mallinson, Bob Fontana, Denis Mee, Mark Kryder, and Emerson Pugh.
- In 2012, Thompson and Lubomyr Romankiw were inducted into the National Inventors Hall of Fame as "scientists whose invention paved the way for the advancement of commercial disk storage technology used in computers, digital cameras and other devices". The US Patent No. 4,295,173 for "Magnetic Thin-Film Storage Head" was cited specifically. The ten inductees for 2012 included Steve Jobs of Apple.
- In 2017, Thompson and Bajorek were interviewed by Dal Allen as part of the Computer History Museum series of oral histories.

== Personal background ==
Thompson grew up in North Dakota and attended Devils Lake High School. He attended Carnegie Institute of Technology (now CMU) Department of Electrical Engineering. He received a bachelor's degree in 1962, a master's degree in 1963. In 1966, Thompson received a Ph.D. degree supervised by Leo Finzi and Hsu Chang

Thompson retired from IBM in 2000.
