= Dieny =

Dieny or Diény is a French surname. Notable people with the surname include:

- Amy Dommel-Dieny(1894–1981), French musicologist and composer
- Bernard Dieny, French physicist and an entrepreneur
- Jean-Pierre Diény (1927–2014), French sinologist
- Yves Diény (1911–1944), French French doctor and World War II resistance fighter
