= Robert Fontana =

American data storage engineer, inventor, and author

Robert E. Fontana Jr.
- Bob Fontana in 2005
- Born: July 17, 1947 (age 79); Champaign, Illinois
- Education: Massachusetts Institute of Technology
- Occupations: Engineer, Physicist
- Employer(s): Texas Instruments, IBM, Hitachi GST
- Spouse: Barbara A Francis (1983 - )
- Awards: Fellow Institute of Electrical and Electronics Engineers, 1996; IEEE Cledo Brunetti Award, 2000; President, IEEE Magnetics Society, 2001-2002; Member National Academy of Engineering 2002; IEEE Magnetics Society Achievement Award, 2005; IEEE Magnetics Society Distinguished Lecturer, 2005; IEEE Magnetics Society Distinguished Service Award, 2017

Robert E Fontana is an engineer, physicist, and author who is noted for his contributions in the areas of magnetic recording and data storage on hard disk drives (HDD) and on digital tape recorders. His work has concentrated on developing thin film processing techniques for nano-fabrication of magnetic devices including Giant Magnetoresistance read heads now used universally in magnetic recording. Much of his career was with IBM in San Jose, California. He is a Fellow of the Institute of Electrical and Electronics Engineers and a member of the National Academy of Engineering.

== Background and education ==
Fontana grew up in Champaign, Illinois. He received a Bachelor's, a Master's, and a Ph.D. degrees all from Massachusetts Institute of Technology (MIT) Department of Electrical Engineering in 1969, 1971, and 1975, respectively. Fontana completed his Ph.D. on the optical and magnetic properties of thin films under the direction of Professor David J. Epstein.

== Career ==
Fontana joined Texas instruments in Dallas, Texas, in 1975 to work on magnetic bubble memory devices. He had been originally introduced to magnetic bubble memory in 1970 in an IEEE lecture by Andrew Eschenfelder of IBM. He was encouraged in this work by Dennis Bus who was also a visiting scientist at MIT and by Dean Toombs, the VP in charge of bubbles at TI

In 1981, Fontana joined the IBM Almaden Research Center in San Jose, California, to work on thin film magnetic recording heads. He made significant contributions in the development of processing of both inductive write heads and three generations of magnetoresistive read heads. These included Anisotropic Magnetoresistance (AMR) heads, Giant Magnetoresistance (GMR) heads. and Tunnel magnetoresistance (TMR) heads. Fontana's colleagues and collaborators included Ta Lin Hsu, Ching Tsang, Christopher Bajorek, Heiner Sussner, Prakash Kasiraj, Bob Scranton, Rick Dill.

From 2003 to 2007, Fontana worked for Hitachi GST (a result of Hitachi's purchase of IBM's disk-drive division). His work at Hitachi GST at that time focussed on nano structure e-beam fabrication and on novel flux detecting sensors including all-metal CPP GMR sensors that scale well to very small device sizes.

In 2008, Fontana re-joined the IBM Almaden Research Center to work on heads for magnetic tape recording. In particular he contributed to the development and implementation of TMR read heads suitable for the harsh tape recording environment. In addition, Fontana published several papers with S. Hetzler and G. Decad examining the global market and technology outlook for data storage technologies in general comparing solid-state, optical, hard disk drive, and tape.

During his career, Fontana played an important role in several technical societies including the National Academy of Engineering and the National Research Council. In particular, he played an influential role with the IEEE Magnetics Society encouraged by Denis Mee, Mark Kryder, and Dave Thompson. Fontana served on the 'MagSoc' Administrative Committee and in various roles supporting IEEE conferences. For example, Fontana was Conference Chair for the joint MMM/Intermag conference in 2004. In 2001 and 2002, he served as president of the IEEE Magnetics Society and was formally recognized for his long-standing contributions to the Society in 2017.

Fontana was a Consulting Professor at Stanford University Materials Science and Engineering from 2006 to 2011

Fontana retired from IBM in July 2021. He lives in San Jose, California.

== Awards and recognition ==
Fontana has been recognized internationally and received multiple awards for his contributions to magnetic recording technology and his leadership in the engineering community:

- Fellow Institute of Electrical and Electronics Engineers, 1996 "for development of novel processes for magnetic devices, most notably magneto-resistive thin film heads"
- IEEE Cledo Brunetti Award, 2000. This is a technical field award from IEEE for "outstanding contributions to nanotechnology and technologies for microsystem miniaturization". Fontana's citation reads: "for contributions to micro fabrication techniques for the manufacture of thin film and giant magnetoresistive heads used in hard disk drives"
- Member National Academy of Engineering 2002 "For contributions to microfabrication techniques for the manufacture of thin-film storage devices"
- IEEE Magnetics Society Distinguished Lecturer, 2005 "Micro-Fabrication Techniques for Magnetic Information Storage Devices: From Bubbles to Thin-Film Recording Heads to Nanomagnetic Structures"
- IEEE Magnetics Society Achievement Award, 2005, the highest award offered by the Magnetics Society
- IEEE Magnetics Society Distinguished Service Award, 2017 "for establishing the structure and enhancing the international impact of major technical conferences sponsored by the IEEE Magnetics Society"

== Patents and publications ==
Fontana is the author or coauthor of 141 US. patents as well as 61 publications in scientific and engineering journals. The majority of these are in the area of thin film processing applied to nanometer-scale magnetic transducers for magnetic data storage in hard disk drives and digital tape recorders. Several more recent publications address the status and outlook comparing solid-state, optical, HDD and tape storage technologies
