= Neal Bertram =

American physicist, teacher, and author

H. Neal Bertram
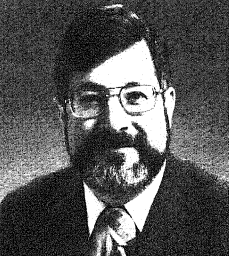
- Neal Bertram in 1985
- Born: June 28, 1941 (age 85); Los Angeles, California
- Education: Reed College, Harvard University
- Occupations: Engineer, Physicist, Author
- Employer(s): Ampex, UCSD
- Spouse: Ann Leslie Pollock
- Awards: IEEE Distinguished Lecturer, 1986; IEEE Fellow 1987; IEEE Reynold B. Johnson Information Storage Systems Award, 2003; IEEE Magnetics Society Achievement Award, 2006

Neal Bertram is a physicist noted for his contributions to the theory of magnetic recording. From 1968 to 1985, he worked for Ampex Corporation in Redwood City. From 1985 to 2004, he was an Endowed Chair Professor at the Center for Memory and Recording Research (CMRR), University of California at San Diego. He is the author of the book "Theory of Magnetic Recording". He is an elected Fellow of the Institute of Electrical and Electronics Engineers. In 2003, he won the IEEE Reynold B. Johnson Information Storage Systems Award.

== Background and education ==
Harold Neal Bertram was born in Los Angeles County, California, in 1941. He attended North Hollywood High School.

Bertram received his B.A. from Reed College, Portland, OR in 1963. He obtained an A.M. degrees in 1964 and Ph.D. in Physics in 1968, both from Harvard University in Cambridge, Massachusetts. His thesis was entitled "Magnetoelastic Effects in Europium Iron Garnet".

Bertram married Ann Pollock in 1964. They have one son, "Seth". Bertram retired from CMRR in 2004 and moved from La Jolla, California to the City of San Mateo, California where they currently reside. Bertram "has had a life-long interest in music. He plays the cello, participates in numerous musical groups and gives concerts on occasion" (quote from CMRR biography).

== Career ==
From 1968 to 1985, Bertram led the Recording Physics Group at Ampex Corporation in Redwood City reporting to John Mallinson. His first focus was on particulate tape media researching magnetization reversal and modeling AC-biased recording. He generalized the concept of reciprocity in magnetic recording. Bertram engaged in a variety of studies on magnetic media, first for flexible tape and later on thin film disks. These studies focussed on high density signals and noise including the behavior of the write head pole-tips under saturation.

In 1985, Bertram joined the faculty at the University of California at San Diego as an Endowed Chair Professor in the Electrical and Computer Engineering Department and worked at the Center for Memory and Recording Research (CMRR) at UC San Diego. (The other three endowed chairs at CMRR were held by Jack Wolf, Frank Talke, Ami Berkowitz. John Mallinson was director). Bertram developed a research program in the physics of magnetic recording. This included studies of granular thin film media, write and read heads, and the ultimate areal-density limit in high density magnetic recording collaborating, for example, with Mason Lamar Williams.

Bertram taught graduate courses in magnetic recording theory, magnetic recording measurements, and analysis of recording materials. He supervised the work of a number of graduate students and post-doctoral fellows. These included Jimmy Zhu, Carl Che, Manfred Schabes, Kaizhong Gao, Dan Wei, Xiaobin Wang, David Wachenschwanz, Samuel Yuan and Alex Barany among many others. In particular, the work with Zhu on large scale numerical simulations utilizing the San Diego Supercomputer Center revealed the critical role of exchange interaction in perpendicular magnetic recording.

Bertram was also recognized for the important collaborative role in research sponsored by the National Storage Industry Consortium (now Information Storage Industry Consortium, INSIC) founded in 1991 to enhance industry competitiveness thru cooperation between universities and industry.

In 2004, Bertram retired from CMRR and moved back to the San Francisco Bay Area. He continued in a role as emeritus Professor at UCSD and also consulted part-time for Hitachi GST.

== Awards and recognition ==
In 1986, Bertram was selected to be an IEEE Magnetics Society Distinguished Lecturer giving a talk entitled, "Unsolved Problems in the Physics of Magnetic Recording".

In 1987, Bertram was named an IEEE Fellow "for contributions to the theory and applications of magnetic recording".

In 2003, Bertram won the IEEE Reynold B. Johnson Information Storage Systems Award for "fundamental and pioneering contributions to magnetic recording physics research". This is a Technical Field Award of the IEEE given each year to an individual that has made outstanding contributions to information storage systems. Other contemporary recipients include Denis Mee, Chris Bajorek, Mark Kryder, Alan Shugart, Jim Lemke.

In 2004, Bertram and Kaizhong Gao were honored with the annual technical achievement award from INSIC (International Storage Industry Consortium) for "pioneering work in the exploration of tilted magnetic recording and the resulting insights contributed to the INSIC EHDR Research Program for advanced hard disk storage technology". Bertram was similarly honored earlier in 1999.

In 2006, Bertram received the IEEE Magnetics Society 2006 Achievement Award for "contributions to the understanding of magnetic recording".

== Books and publications ==
Neal Bertram is a physicist noted for his contributions to the theory of magnetic recording. He is the author of the widely cited book "Theory of Magnetic Recording" (Cambridge University Press, March 1994). The book was translated into Mandarin Chinese by Xiaodong Che.

in 1992, Bertram and J. Zhu collaborated on the chapter "Fundamental Magnetization Processes in Thin-Film Recording Media" in Solid State Physics: Volume 46, Eds. H. Ehrenreich & D. Turnbull

Bertram has authored/co-authored over 285 scientific papers largely related to Magnetic Recording for Tape Recorders and Hard Disk Drives (HDDs).
