= Bruce Gurney =

American physicist and inventor

Bruce Alvin Gurney
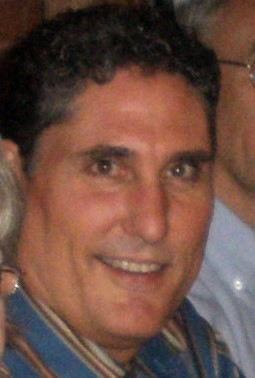
- Gurney in 2009
- Born: 8 July 1957; Oregon, USA
- Died: 20 October 2023 (aged 66); Sunnyvale, California, U.S.
- Education: Caltech, Cornell
- Occupations: Physicist and Inventor
- Employer(s): IBM, Hitachi GST, Western Digital
- Spouse: Noemi Bolvary
- Awards: IBM Outstanding Technical Achievement Award, 1998; APS Fellow, 2000; IEEE Reynold B. Johnson Award, 2004; IEEE Fellow, 2014

Bruce Alvin Gurney (8 July 1957 – 20 October 2023) was an American physicist responsible for pioneering advances in magnetic recording. In particular, he was central to the development of the giant magnetoresistance (GMR) sensors first used in hard disk drives in 1997.

== Education and career ==
Bruce Gurney was born in Oregon, USA, but grew up and was educated in San Diego, California. He attended the Will C. Crawford High School. He received a B.S. in physics from Caltech in 1979 and an M.S. in physics from Cornell in 1982. He completed a Ph.D. at Cornell on surface science in 1987.

In 1987, Gurney joined IBM in San Jose working on thin-film deposition and characterization. He was a coinventor on the original spin-valve (GMR) patent. In 1991, Gurney moved to the IBM Almaden Research Center where he oversaw the transfer of spin-valve technology into development and into manufacturing. Gurney continued to lead research efforts on advanced read heads as the IBM HDD division was purchased first by Hitachi in 2003 then subsequently coming under Western Digital in 2013. During this time, he contributed to magnetic tunnel junction read head technology, spin-torque oscillator writer design for Microwave Assisted Magnetic Recording (MAMR), and also media technology (Anti-Ferromagnetically Coupled (AFC) media and bit-patterned media).

== Awards and honors ==
In 1992, Gurney shared in an IBM Outstanding Technical Achievement Award for the development of spin valves. In 2000, Gurney became a Fellow of the American Physical Society for "leadership in the invention, implementation, and investigation of spin valve and giant magnetoresistive materials for recording sensors, and innovations in spin dependent transport and other phenomena in ferromagnetic layered structure".

In 2004, Bruce Gurney and Virgil Speriosu received the IEEE_Reynold B. Johnson Information Storage Systems Award for "For key technical contributions to the development of spin valve giant magnetoresistive recording heads for computer data storage devices.".

In 2014, Gurney was named Fellow of the Institute of Electrical and Electronics Engineers (IEEE) for "contributions to spin valve Giant Magnetoresistance (GMR) sensors for magnetic recording systems".

Gurney was an active member of the IEEE Magnetics Society and served in various capacities including Awards Chair. In particular, he chaired the 2016 joint MMM-Intermag Conference in San Diego

In 2019, Gurney, together with Virgil Speriosu, Bernard Dieny, and Mustafa Pinarbasi participated in an oral history conducted by Christopher Bajorek on the "Invention, Development and Commercialization of GMR Heads" at the Computer History Museum, Mountain View, California.

Gurney has authored or coauthored numerous scientific publications and patents. Most of the research focused on nanotechnology and on read sensors and media for magnetic recording.
