= Tu Chen =

Taiwanese-American scientist and entrepreneur

- 陳都
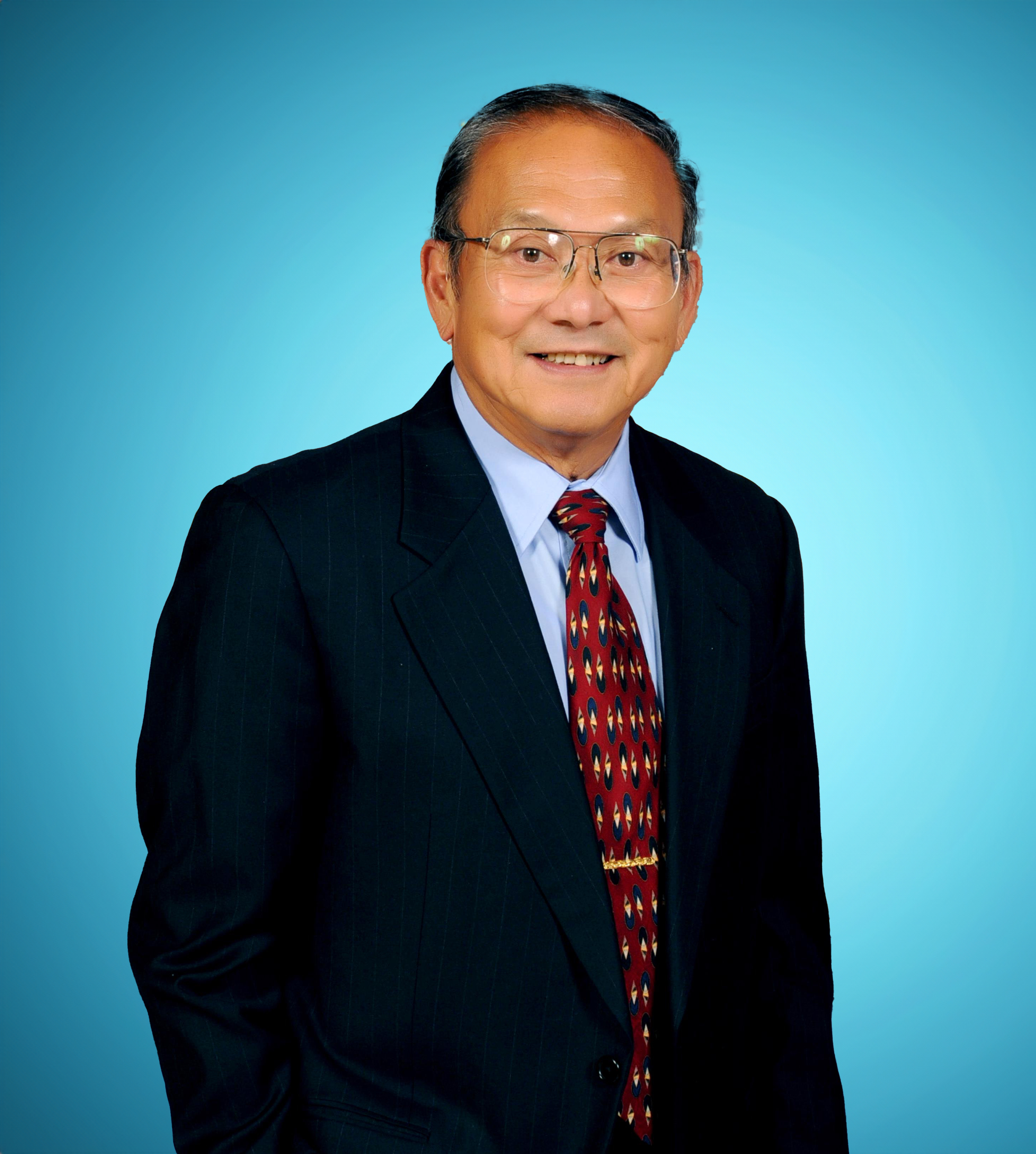
- Born: March 19, 1935 (age 91); Yilan County, Taiwan
- Education: National Cheng Kung University (BS); University of Minnesota (MS, PhD)
- Occupations: Materials scientist; inventor; entrepreneur
- Employer(s): IBM, Northrop, Xerox, Komag, Headway
- Spouse: Nancy Pi-Fang
- Awards: IEEE Reynold B. Johnson Award (2001); Institute of Electrical and Electronics Engineers (2014)

Tu Chen (Chinese: 陳都; born 19 March 1935) is a Taiwanese-American scientist and entrepreneur who played a central role in the development of thin-film media for computer hard disk drives. In 1983, he co-founded Komag which was subsequently purchased by Western Digital in 2007. Since his retirement in 1999, Chen has devoted himself to technological advancement in Taiwan.

== Early life and education ==
Chen grew up in Yilan County, Taiwan before attending the National Cheng Kung University, Tainan, from which he earned a B.S degree in metallurgical engineering. He served in the ROTC (Taiwan) and then as a high school math and physics teacher before moving to the United States in 1961. He received his M.S. in 1964 and his Ph.D. in 1967, both from the University of Minnesota and both in metallurgical engineering.

== Career ==
In 1967, Chen joined IBM in Edicott, New York, but, a year later, relocated to California to accept a Senior Scientist position at Northrop Corp. In 1971, he was recruited by Xerox for their Xerox Palo Alto Research Center (PARC). His various projects included thin film physics for data storage applications.

In 1983, he left PARC to co-found Komag, a company dedicated to the development and manufacturing of thin-film media for hard disk drives. The change from "brown disks" (iron-oxide particulate media) to thin-film metallic media represented a major advance in HDD technology. The company was purchased in 2007 by Western Digital

In 1996, Chen co-founded Headway Technologies, a company dedicated to the development and manufacturing of thin-film read/write heads for hard disk drives and served as vice chairman.

Since his retirement, Chen has devoted himself to technological advancement in Taiwan. He has served on the Board of Directors of the Industrial Technology Research Institute (ITRI), Taiwan.

== Support for Taiwanese culture and pro-democracy movement ==
After moving to the San Francisco Bay Area in 1971, Tu Chen became very active in the promotion of Taiwanese culture and also the Taiwanese democracy movement. He was instrumental in forming a group called Northern California Formosa Federation, NCFF (now the Taiwanese American Federation of Northern California (TAFNC 北加州台灣郷同聯合會)) and served as president in 1975 and 1976. Chen was also one of the co-founders of the Taiwanese Alliance for Interculture (TAI 台灣協志會), which was formed in 1973 to promote the Taiwanese culture in the United States and to support the democratization of Taiwan.

In 1980, as an outcome of the Kaohsiung incident, a Taiwanese military court declared the TAI a “rebel group” and named Tu Chen and Ching C. (Jim) Shir, the co-founder of TAFNC and TAI, as “national traitors.” Jim Shir is one of the co-founders of Komag. Both were unable to return to Taiwan for many years as a result and faced intimidation by underground gangsters allegedly operating within the US under the direction of Kuomintang.

Chen was elected to serve as president of the Taiwanese American Association (全美台灣同郷) from 1983 to 1984 and the World Federation of Taiwanese Associations (WFTA 世界台灣同郷會聯合會) for two terms between 1983 and 1987. In 2022, Chen gave a talk on the history of TAFNC to its members.

== Awards and honors ==
In 1988, Chen received the Entrepreneur of the Year Award from Venture Magazine and Arthur Young.

In 1990, Chen received the Pacific Islander Outstanding Achievement Award in Washington DC.

In 1996, Chen received the Outstanding Alumni Award from Cheng Kung University of Tainan, Taiwan.

In 1999, Chen was elevated to Life Fellow of the Institute of Electrical and Electronics Engineers (IEEE) for "contributions to the development of thin-film materials, tools, and processes used for magnetic and optical information storage disks".

In 2001, he received the IEEE Reynold B. Johnson Information Storage Systems Award for “leadership in the advancement of thin-film materials, tools, and processes used for magnetic information disks, and their commercialization as products”.

In 2005, Chen was interviewed by Chris Bajorek to create an oral history for the Computer History Museum, Mountain View.

In 2015, Chen received the Outstanding Achievement Award from the University of Minnesota, College of Science and Engineering.
