= Charles Coleman (engineer) =

American electronics engineer

Chuck Coleman
- Charles Hubert Coleman Jr.
- Born: October 28, 1926; Washington, D.C.
- Died: July 13, 2005 (aged 78); San Jose, California
- Occupations: Engineer, inventor
- Employers: US Marines; WBKB; CBS Television; Ampex
- Awards: IEEE Vladimir K. Zworykin Award, 1970; SMPTE David Sarnoff Gold Medal, 1970

Charles Hubert Coleman Jr. (October 28, 1926 – July 13, 2005) was an American electronics engineer and a pioneer in the field of color video tape recording and later in high data-rate digital tape recording. He was also an amateur explorer and avid pilot.

== Early life ==
Coleman was born on October 28, 1926, in Washington, DC and, as one of three children, grew up in Charleston, Illinois. His father was a professor of history at a state teacher's college. On his 17th birthday in October 1943, he joined the US Marines. Following boot camp, he was shipped to the Pacific and spent the remainder of the war teaching young Marines how to be radio technicians. Upon discharge in 1946, he joined WBKB-TV (now WBBM) in Chicago. In 1953, WBKB-TV was purchased by CBS Television. At CBS he quickly became a pioneer in the brand new field of video tape recording. Coleman invented Autotec time base correction and applied it to improve the quality of the black and white TV broadcasts from WBKB

== Career at Ampex ==
By 1960, engineers at Ampex Corporation in had recognized the superior quality of the recorded TV images being shown on a certain Chicago TV station (WBKB). Coleman was quickly lured to join Ampex in Redwood City, California where he spent the rest of his career on perfecting video tape recording and pushing the boundaries of high data-rate tape-recording. Coleman made many inventions and received many accolades for his work. He received both the SMPTE David Sarnoff Gold Medal and the IEEE Vladimir K. Zworykin Award in 1970 and, subsequently, the Alexander M. Poniatoff Award at Ampex in 1971, for his contributions to color video tape recording. Coleman was also the driving force behind the Digital Cassette Recording System. Ampex' most successful digital product. His colleagues at Ampex included Charles Ginsburg, John Mallinson, and Neal Bertram.
