= Charles Mee =

Charles Mee may refer to:

- Charles L. Mee (born 1938), American playwright, historian and author
- Charles Denis Mee (1927–2023), British-American engineer, physicist, and author
