= Adrian Ionescu =

Adrian Ionescu may refer to:

- Adrian Ionescu (footballer, born 1985), Romanian football defensive midfielder
- Adrian Ionescu (footballer, born 1958), Romanian football forward
- Adrian Mihai Ionescu, professor at the Swiss Federal Institute of Technology
