= Robert Weber (astronomer) =

American astronomer

Minor planets discovered: 8
8409 Valentaugustus	28 November 1995	list
11602 Miryang	28 September 1995	list
12005 Delgiudice	19 May 1996	list
23612 Ramzel	22 January 1996	list
26906 Rubidia	22 January 1996	list
37687 Chunghikoh	30 August 1995	list
39645 Davelharris	31 August 1995	list
(285178) 1996 OZ	18 July 1996	list

Robert Weber (1926–2008) was an American astronomer and discoverer of minor planets who ran the precursor to the LINEAR project shortly before his retirement in 1996. Data were collected by manually entering telescope pointing positions and requesting an image save. Searching twenty fields was a taxing experience. They did have automatic object detection working, but no starfield matching at that time.

The inner main-belt asteroid 6181 Bobweber, discovered by Eleanor Helin at Palomar Observatory in 1986, was named in his honour on 21 March 2008. (M.P.C. 62353).

== Career ==
Weber graduated from the MIT Department of Physics in 1959, and was with the MIT Lincoln Laboratory in Lexington for 34 years (1962–1996). He also worked on sounding rockets, and interplanetary particles and fields with the Helios, Voyager, and IMP programmes.

He led the team that developed the prototype for the Air Force GEODSS deep space satellite tracking network (the two LINEAR telescopes are GEODSS assets that were originally destined for Portugal). He is also responsible for the project that led to the development of the CCID16 CCD chip used in the LINEAR cameras, a natural consequence of earlier work in solid state physics.

== Discovered minor planets ==
- 8409 Valentaugustus – Discovered 1995 November 28 by R. Weber's Team at MIT's ETS in Socorro. Valentin Augustus Weber (1867–1940) was the grandfather of the team leader. Born in Germany, he moved to the U.S.\ in 1889, where he designed and constructed stained-glass windows for cathedrals and mahogany furniture for his friends and neighbors in Brooklyn, New York.
- 11602 Miryang – Discovered 1995 September 28 by R. Weber's Team at MIT's ETS, Socorro. A small town in South Korea, just north of Daegu, Miryang was the birthplace of the team leader's wife, Chung-hi Koh (Helen) Weber.
- 12005 Delgiudice – Discovered 1996 May 19 by R. Weber's Team at MIT's ETS, Socorro. Maria del Giudice (b. 1964) is the wife of one of the team's observers and measurers, Frank Shelly.
- 23612 Ramzel – Discovered 1996 January 22 by R. Weber's Team at MIT's ETS, Socorro. Allen Lee Ramzel (b. 1960) was an observer and systems engineer for the team that discovered this object. This minor planet also honors his family.
- 26906 Rubidia – Discovered 1996 January 22 by R. Weber at the MIT's ETS in Socorro. Rubidia (Ruby) Mendez-Harris (b. 1945) is the wife of David L. Harris, a member of the team that discovered this object. Born in Huehuetenango, Guatemala, she was educated as a psychologist and still practices therapy and counseling in Socorro. This name was suggested by D. L. Harris in 1998.
- 37687 Chunghikoh – Named after R. Weber's wife. Chung-hi (Helen) Koh was the mother of seven children, a registered pharmacist, a volunteer nurse's aid and a kind hearted soul. More information coming.
- 39645 Davelharris – Named after a good friend and member of R. Weber's team. David Lowell Harris was the beloved husband of Ruby Mendez Harris and an enthusiastic member of R. Weber's team. More information coming.

== Publications by Robert Weber ==
Confirmation of the following publications can be found at the following websites:

- https://libraries.mit.edu/archives/
- journals.aps.org
- http://www.iop.org/EJ/journal/0022-3727
- (1959) The resonant-frequency shift of a microwave cavity caused by the high-density plasma in semiconductors, as a function of magnetic field. Physics. Cambridge, Massachusetts Institute of Technology. Science Doctorate.
- (1961) Robert Weber & P.E. Tannenwald, "Exchange Integral in Cobalt from Spin-Wave Resonance." The Physical Review 121(3): 715.
- (1963) Tannenwald, P. E. & Robert Weber, "Second-Order Exchange Interactions from Spin Wave Resonance." The Journal of Physics and Chemistry Solids 24: 1357-1361.
- (1964) "Ultrasonic Measurements in Normal and Superconducting Niobium." The Physical Review 133(6A): A1487-A1492.
- (1965) Tannenwald, P. E. & Robert Weber, "Long-Range Exchange Interactions from Spin-Wave Resonance." The Physical Review 140(2A): A498-A506.
- (1966) Robert Weber & P.E. Tannenwald, "Temperature Variation of the Spin-Wave Dispersion Relation." Journal of Applied Physics 37(3): 1058-1059.
- (1966) "Comparative Data on CdS Transducers from 14 Mc/s to 70 Gc/s." Proceedings of the IEEE 54(2): 333-334.
- (1966) "Electron Bombardment Technique for Deposition of CdS Film Transducers." The Review of Scientific Instruments 37(7): 955-956.
- (1969) Robert Weber &. M. H. S., "Nuclear Linewidth Measurements of 55Mn In Antiferromagnetic CsMnF3 and RbMnF3." Solid State Communications 7: 619-622.
- (1968) Tannenwald, P. E. & Robert Weber, "Comments on Standing Spin-Wave Resonance in 'Flash-Evaporated' Permally Films." Physical Review Letters 20(17): 918-919.
- (1968) "Magnon-Phonon Coupling in Metallic Films." The Physical Review 169(2): 451-456.
- (1968) "Observation of Magnetoelastic Coupling by Spin-Wave Resonance." Journal of Applied Physics 39(2 (Part I)): 491.
- (1968) "Spin-Wave Resonance." IEEE Transactions on Magnetics Mag-4(1): 28-31.
- (1970) Robert Weber, P.E Tannenwald and C.H Bajorek, "Intensities of Spin-Wave Resonand Modes in Thin Films." Applied Physics Letters 16(1): 35-37.
- (1971) MSFN/DSN Integration Program for the DSS 11 26-m Antenna Prototype Station. The Deep Space Network Progress Report, TR 32-1526, March and April 1971. MIT: 197-202.
- (1974) Robert Weber & T.H. Brooks. The limits of detectability of a low-light-level point-source sensor as a function of telescope aperture, sensor resolution, night-sky background, and pre-readout electron gain. MIT.
- (1974) Visual Magnitude Flux Rate Density Standards for Sunlight Incident on Photoemissive Surfaces. MIT.
- (1976) The detection capabilities of gallium arsenide and s-20 photo multiplier tubes to go-type, point source, signals. MIT.
- (1976) Nominal event support: The observation of synchronous satellite number 83594 by GEODSS on days 181,182,183 and 184 1976 (UTC). MIT.
- (1976) Predicted and measured detection capabilities of the Lincoln ETS, photon-noise-limited, elector-optical systems. MIT.
- (1977) The amplitude effect of point-source blooming as a function of background level in ebsicon-type camera tubes. MIT.
- (1977) Field-Testing and Evaluation of the TRW Streak MTI System. MIT.
- (1977) Photoemissive and electroemissive surfaces and sandwiches. MIT.
- (1978) The ground-based electro-optical detection of deep-space satellites. Applications of electronic imaging systems; Proceedings of the Seminar, Washington, D.C., March 30, 31, 1978 (A79-17202 05-35) Bellingham, Washington, Society of Photo-Optical Instrumentation Engineers: 59-69.
- (1978) Limiting point-source detection capabilities of two-dimensional, scanned, optical detector arrays in constant false-alarm systems. MIT.
- (1978) The passive, ground-based, electro-optical detection of synchronous satellites. MIT.
- (1979) Large-format Ebsicon for low-light-level satellite surveillance. Recent Advances in TV Sensors and Systems. San Diego, California, Society of Photo-Optical Instrumentation Engineers.
- (1979) "Passive ground-based electro-optical detection of artificial earth satellites." Optical Engineering 18(1): 82-91.
- (1979) Updated 2005. Some Field Test Results - Teal Amber CCD Sensor, MIT.
- (1981) "Large-Format Ebiscon for Low Light Level Satellite Surveillance." Optical Engineering 20(2): 212-215.
- (1983) Optical detection loss due to air-borne salts on Diego Garcia. MIT.
- (1983) Perturbations on the reception characteristics of antennas on Diego Garcia due to the presence of a GEODSS site. MIT.
- (1985) Dwell-in-Dell Detection - Design and Performance Implications, MIT.
- (1992) The Transportable Optical System (TOS): A Comprehensive Overview, MIT.
- Robert Weber should not be confused with the Technical University of Vienna's Robert Weber, or the U.S. Court of International Trade's Robert Weber.
