= IEEE Cledo Brunetti Award =

- Awarded for: Outstanding contributions to nanotechnology and miniaturization in the electronics arts
- Sponsored by: IEEE
- First award: 1978
- Website: IEEE Cledo Brunetti Award

The IEEE Cledo Brunetti Award is an award presented annually for outstanding contributions to nanotechnology and miniaturization in the electronics arts. The award was established in 1975 by the IEEE Board of Directors.

Recipients of this award receive bronze medal, a certificate and an honorarium.

In the evaluation process, the evaluators of nominations consider innovation, development, social value, uniqueness of concept, other technical accomplishments, and the quality of the nomination.

Recipients are typically approved during the June IEEE Board of Directors meeting, usually held towards the end of the month. Recipients and their nominators are notified following the meeting. Subsequently, the nominators of unsuccessful candidates are also notified of the status of their nomination.

== Recipients ==
The past recipients are:

- 2027: Edward Charles Gage, Ganping Ju, Jan-Ulrich Thiele
- 2026: Anthony Yen
- 2025: Daniel Worledge, Guohan Hu, Gwan-Hyeob Koh
- 2024: Adrian M. Ionescu
- 2023: John Robertson
- 2022: Simon Deleonibus
- 2021: Jesus Del Alamo
- 2020: James H. Stathis, Ernest Yue Wu
- 2019: Daniel C. Edelstein, Alfred Grill, Chao-Kun Hu
- 2018: Siegfried Selberherr
- 2017: Guido Groeseneken
- 2016: Akira Toriumi
- 2015: Hiroshi Iwai
- 2014: Martin van den Brink
- 2013: Giorgio Baccarani
- 2012: Yan Borodovsky, Sam Sivakumar
- 2011: Massimo V. Fischetti, David J. Frank, Steven E. Laux
- 2010: Ghavam Shahidi
- 2009: Burn-Jeng Lin
- 2008: Michel Bruel
- 2007: Sandip Tiwari
- 2006: Susumu Namba
- 2005: William G. Oldham
- 2004: Stephen Y. Chou
- 2003: Andrew R. Neureuther
- 2002: Mark Lundstrom, Supriyo Datta
- 2001: R. Fabian W. Pease
- 2000: Robert Fontana
- 1999: David K. Ferry
- 1998: Roger T. Howe, Richard S. Muller
- 1997: Dieter P. Kern, George A. Sai-Halasz, Matthew R. Wordeman
- 1996: Mitsumasa Koyanagi
- 1995: Henry I. Smith
- 1994: Eiji Takeda
- 1993: Takafumi Nambu, Mitsuru Ida, Kamon Yoshiyuki
- 1992: David A. Thompson
- 1991: Hideo Sunami
- 1990: Else Kooi
- 1989: Shun-ichi Iwasaki
- 1988: Irving Ames, Francois M. d'Heurle, Richard E. Horstmann
- 1987: Michael Hatzakis
- 1986: Richard M. White
- 1985: Alec N. Broers
- 1984: Harry W. Rubinstein
- 1982: Robert H. Dennard
- 1981: Donald R. Herriott
- 1980: Marcian E. Hoff, Jr.
- 1979: Philip J. Franklin
- 1979: Geoffrey W. A. Dummer
- 1978: Robert N. Noyce
- 1978: Jack S. Kilby
