= John Mallinson =

John Mallinson may refer to:

- John Mallinson (trade unionist), Scottish trade unionist and politician
- John C. Mallinson, British physicist
