= 6181 Bobweber =

Main-belt asteroid

Discovery
- Discovered by: E. F. Helin
- Discovery site: Palomar Obs.
- Discovery date: 6 September 1986

Designations
- Named after: Robert Weber (astronomer)
- Alternative designations: 1986 RW · 1979 YU_{8} 1990 WL_{2}
- Minor planet category: main-belt · (inner)

Orbital characteristics
- Epoch 4 September 2017 (JD 2458000.5)
- Uncertainty parameter 0
- Observation arc: 62.59 yr (22,860 days)
- Aphelion: 3.0105 AU
- Perihelion: 1.8500 AU
- Semi-major axis: 2.4302 AU
- Eccentricity: 0.2388
- Orbital period (sidereal): 3.79 yr (1,384 days)
- Mean anomaly: 30.628°
- Mean motion: 0° 15^{m} 36.72^{s} / day
- Inclination: 7.5690°
- Longitude of ascending node: 303.65°
- Argument of perihelion: 93.589°

Physical characteristics
- Dimensions: 4.458±0.056 km 4.488±0.046 km 5.66 km (calculated)
- Synodic rotation period: 2.7576±0.0001 h 2.75796±0.00003 h (Note: Pravec (2009): lightcurve plot of (6181) Bobweber, with a rotation period 2.75796±0.00003 hours and a brightness amplitude of 0.12 mag. Summary figures at Collaborative Asteroid Lightcurve Link (CALL) and Pravec, P.; Wolf, M.; Sarounova, L. (2009))
- Geometric albedo: 0.20 (assumed); 0.4210±0.0447; 0.425±0.038
- Spectral type: S
- Absolute magnitude (H): 13.3 · 13.6

6181 Bobweber, provisional designation 1986 RW, is a stony asteroid from the inner regions of the asteroid belt, approximately 5 kilometers in diameter. It was discovered on 6 September 1986, by American astronomer Eleanor Helin at the U.S. Palomar Observatory in California, and named after astronomer Robert Weber.

== Orbit and classification ==
The S-type asteroid orbits the Sun in the inner main-belt at a distance of 1.9–3.0 AU once every 3 years and 9 months (1,384 days). Its orbit has an eccentricity of 0.24 and an inclination of 8° with respect to the ecliptic. The first precovery was taken at the discovering observatory in 1954, which extended the asteroid's observation arc by 32 years prior to its discovery observation.

== Physical characteristics ==
=== Rotation period ===
A rotational lightcurve of Bobweber was obtained from photometric observations by Czech astronomer Petr Pravec at Ondřejov Observatory in December 2009. It gave a well-defined rotation period of 2.75796±0.00003 hours with a brightness variation of 0.12 in magnitude (U=3). In January 2014, astronomer Julian Oey at the Australian Blue Mountains Observatory (Q68) obtained a nearly identical period of 2.7576±0.0001 hours with an amplitude of 0.15 magnitude (U=3-).

=== Diameter and albedo ===
According to the surveys carried out by NASA's Wide-field Infrared Survey Explorer with its subsequent NEOWISE mission, Bobweber measures 4.5 kilometers in diameter and its surface has a high albedo of 0.42 and 0.43, respectively, while the Collaborative Asteroid Lightcurve Link assumes a standard albedo for stony asteroids of 0.20 and calculates a diameter of 5.7 kilometers.

== Naming ==
This minor planet was named in memory of Robert Weber (1926–2008), physicist and discoverer of minor planets at MIT Lincoln Laboratory, developer of the Deep Space Satellite Tracking Network. He also co-developed and was credited with the first discoveries made by the Lincoln Near-Earth Asteroid Research (LINEAR) at Lincoln Laboratory's Experimental Test Site at White Sands Missile Range in Socorro, New Mexico. The approved naming citation was published by the Minor Planet Center on 21 March 2008 (M.P.C. 62353).
