= John C. Mallinson =

British-American physicist

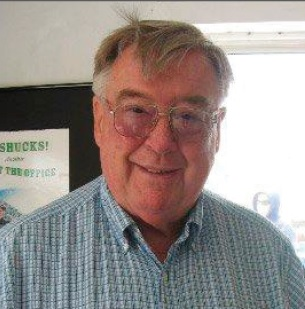
- John C. Mallinson in 2010
- Born: 30 January 1932; Bradford, Yorkshire, United Kingdom
- Died: 24 December 2015 (aged 83); Ojai, California, United States
- Education: University College, Oxford
- Occupation: Physicist
- Employer(s): RAF; AMP Incorporated; Ampex; UC San Diego
- Awards: Fellow of the IEEE, 1984; IEEE Magnetics Society, Distinguished Lecturer, 1984; Alexander M. Poniatoff Golden Achievement Award, 1984; D.Sc. Oxford University, 1997; IEEE Magnetics Society Achievement Award, 2004

John C. Mallinson (30 January 1932 – 24 December 2015) was a British physicist who made significant contributions to the understanding of magnetism and magnetic recording. He is perhaps best remembered for his theoretical work on structures with one-sided magnetic flux. Their use is exemplified in the Halbach array and in the familiar refrigerator magnet.

== Personal life ==
Mallinson was born on 30 January 1932 in Bradford, Yorkshire, UK. He attended University College, Oxford and graduated in 1953 with BA and MA degrees in Natural Philosophy (physics), and an honorary doctorate in 1997. On graduating, he joined the Royal Air Force for a 3-year term, advancing to pilot a Canberra bomber. He remained interested in aviation, and practiced aerobatics over Half Moon Bay, California. He volunteered at the Hiller Air Museum at the San Carlos, California, airport. Mallinson died in December 2015 following a stroke. He had two daughters, Caroline and Elizabeth and several grandchildren.

== Career ==
In 1956, Mallinson emigrated to the United States to join AMP Incorporated in Harrisburg, Pennsylvania, where he studied the magnetic properties of ferrites. In 1962, he moved to the west coast to join Ampex Corporation in Redwood City, California, rising to become the director of the Recording Technology Department. The department included other major contributors in magnetic recording such as Charles Coleman and Neal Bertram. Mallinson was called upon as an expert in the long term archival properties of magnetic tape. Also at Ampex, Mallinson developed the theory for structures with one-sided magnetic flux. One such structure is the Halbach Array which provides a means of generating powerful, well-confined magnetic fields with permanent magnets. The familiar decorative refrigerator magnet also takes advantage of one-sided flux. Also at Ampex, Mallinson oversaw the development of PRML, a new readback technique for magnetic recording.

In 1984, Mallinson left Ampex to become the founding director of the new Center for Magnetic Recording Research (CMRR) at UC San Diego. He was appointed adjunct professor in 1987. By 1990, the Center boasted eight professors and 36 graduate students.

Upon leaving CMRR in 1990, Mallinson taught a course on Magnetism and Magnetic Recording and also took advantage of teaching and research opportunities overseas. In 1993 and 1995, Mallinson was a visiting professor at KTH Royal Institute of Technology in Stockholm, Sweden and was appointed permanent visiting professor in 1996. In 1994, he was a visiting professor at the University of Twente in Enschede, The Netherlands. Also in 1996, he was a distinguished visiting professor, Sony Sabbatical Chair in Yokohama, Japan. From 1998 through 2005, he was a regular visiting professor at Plymouth University, UK, where he collaborated with Hazel Shute and David Wilton. In particular they were able to extend the 2D one-sided flux configurations into 3-dimensions.

== Books ==
Mallinson is the author of four textbooks:

- “The Foundations of Magnetic Recording", Academic Press (1987)
- “The Foundations of Magnetic Recording:, Academic Press (2nd edition, 1993), Maruzen Publishing (Japanese edition) (September 1994)
- “Magneto-Resistive Heads, Fundamentals and Applications", Academic Press (1996), Maruzen Publishing (Japanese edition) (September 1996)
- "Magneto-Resistive and Spin Valve Heads: Fundamentals and Applications (Electromagnetism)", Academic Press; 2nd edition (September 2001), Maruzen Publishing (Japanese edition) (June 2002)
- "Recollections", a collection of short autobiographical stories, unpublished, 2011

Mallinson has published many scientific papers and several contributed book chapters.

== Honours and awards ==
Mallinson became a Fellow of the IEEE in 1982 for "contributions to the theory of magnetic recording". He was selected as the IEEE Magnetics Society Distinguished Lecturer for 1983–4 on the topic of "The Next Decade in Magnetic Recording". In 1984, he was awarded the Alexander M. Poniatoff Golden Achievement Award for "leadership in the theory and practice of magnetic recording". In 1997, he was bestowed with a Doctor of Science degree from Oxford University. In 2007, he received the IEEE Magnetics Society Achievement Award for "contributions to the theory, practice and teaching of magnetic recording"
