= Sandip Tiwari =

Indian-born electrical engineer and applied physicist

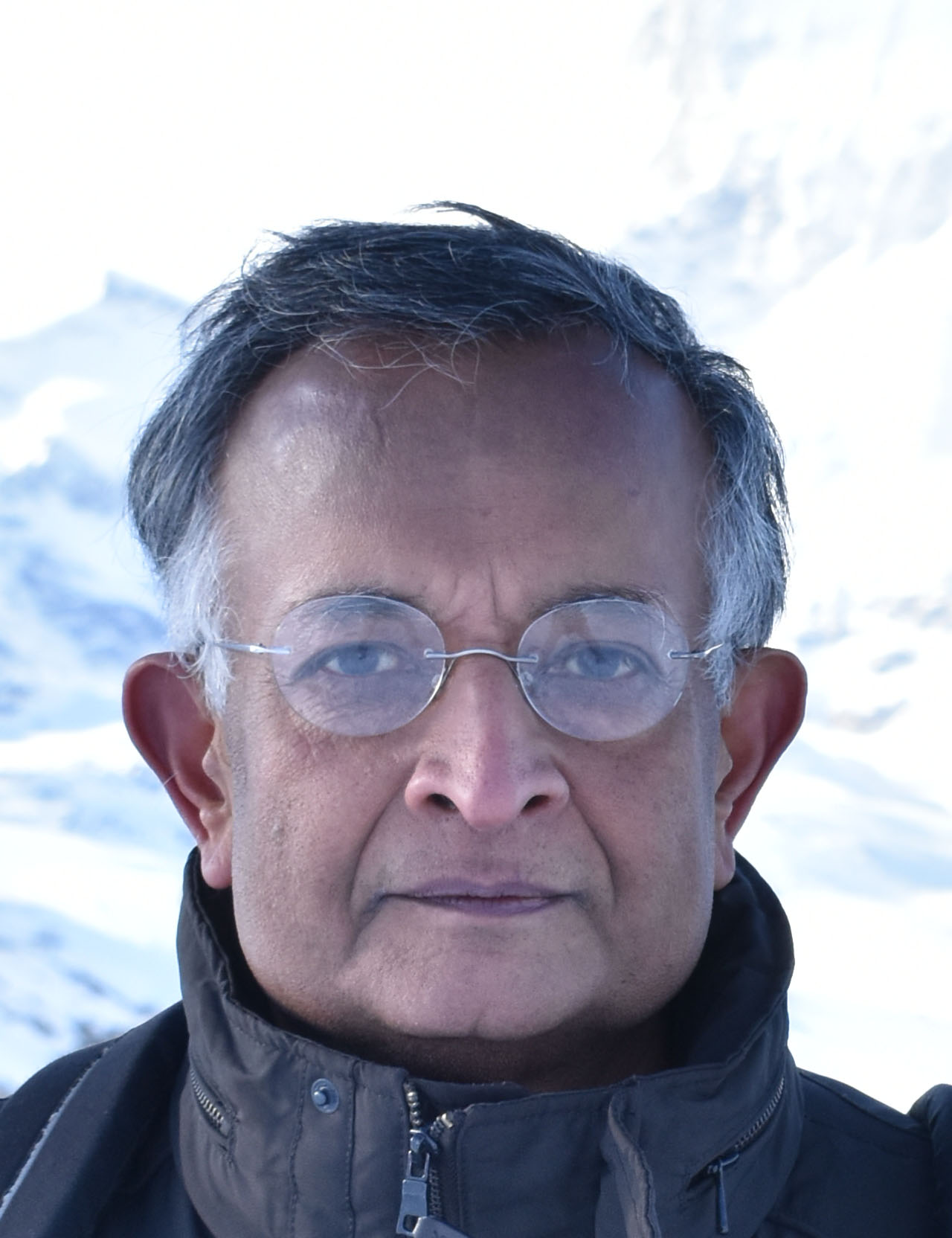
Sandip Tiwari

Sandip Tiwari is an Indian-born electrical engineer and applied physicist. He is the Charles N. Mellowes Professor of Engineering at Cornell University. His previous roles were director of National Nanotechnology Users Network, director of the National Nanotechnology Infrastructure Network, and research scientist at IBM T. J. Watson Research Center. He is best known for his pioneering research in the fields of SiGe transistor and nanocrystal memory.

== Early life and education ==
Sandip Tiwari was born in Ahmedabad, India, and received his BTech from Indian Institute of Technology, Kanpur in 1976. He received his M.Eng. at Rensselaer Polytechnic Institute and PhD at Cornell University in 1980.

== Work and academic career ==
His early research career was at IBM's Research Division until 1999. During this period, he did the early work on compound semiconductor transistors and co-developed the first SiGe transistor. He also pioneered various quantum and nanoscale devices, such as the nanocrystal memory. The first demonstration of SiGe transistor was honored as IEEE International Electron Devices Meeting (IEDM) Top Industry Innovation of 1987. His work on nanocrystal memory was one of the 50 most-cited papers in the history of Applied Physics Letters in 2013.

At Cornell University, his Nanoscale ElectroScience Research Group focused on adaptive approaches for low power design, three-dimensional integration, inexact computing, and Bayesian implementations

== Selected awards and honors ==
- IEEE Cledo Brunetti Award, 2007
- IIT Kanpur Distinguished Alumni Award, 2003
- International Symposium on Compound Semiconductors (ISCS) Young Scientist Award, 1991
- Founding Editor-in-Chief of IEEE Transactions on Nanotechnology, 2002
- Guest Editor of Proceedings of the IEEE, 2015
- Fellow of American Physical Society, 1998
- Life Fellow of IEEE, 1994

== Selected publications ==
=== Books ===
- S. Tiwari, Quantum, Statistical and Information Mechanics: A Unified Introduction, Electroscience series, Vol. 1, Oxford University Press, ISBN 978-0-19-875985-0
- S. Tiwari, Device Physics: Fundamentals of Electronics and Optoelectronics, Electroscience series, Vol. 2, Oxford University Press, ISBN 978-0-19-875984-3, (2022)
- S. Tiwari, Semiconductor Physics: Principles, Theory and Nanoscale, Electroscience series, Vol. 3, Oxford University Press, ISBN 978-0-19-875986-7, (2020)
- S. Tiwari, Nanoscale Device Physics: Science and Engineering Fundamentals, Electroscience series, Vol. 4, Oxford University Press, ISBN 978-0-19-875987-4 (2017)
- S. Tiwari, Compound Semiconductor Device Physics, Academic Press, Inc., (1992) and Elsevier, ISBN 978-0-12-691740-6 (1992); Updated edition available as Open Text from group website

=== Papers ===
- S. Tiwari, Implications of Scales in Processing of Information, Invited Paper, in Proceedings of the IEEE, vol. 103, no. 8, 1250-1273 (2015)
- Tiwari, Sandip; Rana, Farhan; Hanafi, Hussein; Hartstein, Allan; Crabbé, Emmanuel F.; Chan, Kevin (March 4, 1996). "A silicon nanocrystals based memory". Applied Physics Letters. 68 (10): 1377–1379. Bibcode:1996ApPhL..68.1377T. doi:10.1063/1.116085.
- Tiwari, S. (March 15, 1988). "A new effect at high currents in heterostructure bipolar transistors". IEEE Electron Device Letters. 9 (3): 142–144. Bibcode:1988IEDL....9..142T. doi:10.1109/55.2069. S2CID 39623450 – via IEEE Xplore.
