= IEEE Reynold B. Johnson Information Storage Systems Award =

- Awarded for: Outstanding contributions to information storage systems
- Presented by: Institute of Electrical and Electronics Engineers
- First award: 1992
- Website: Reynold B. Johnson Information Storage Systems Award

The IEEE Reynold B. Johnson Information Storage Systems Award is a Technical Field Award of the IEEE given each year to an individual, multiple recipients, or team up to three in number that has made outstanding contributions to information storage systems. The award is named in honor of Reynold B. Johnson.

The award was established in 1991. The award includes a bronze medal, certificate, and honorarium. It was last awarded in 2015.

== Recipients ==
- 2015: Dov Moran and Amir Ban and Simon Litsyn
- 2014: John K. Ousterhout and Mendel Rosenblum
- 2013: Michael L. Kazar
- 2012: Naoya Takahashi
- 2011: (no award)
- 2010: Moshe Yanai
- 2009: Marshall Kirk McKusick
- 2008: Alan Jay Smith
- 2007: David Hitz and James Lau
- 2006: Jaishankar Menon
- 2005: François B. Dolivo
- 2004: Bruce Gurney and Virgil S. Speriosu
- 2003: Neal Bertram
- 2002: Christopher Henry Bajorek
- 2001: Tu Chen
- 2000: Mark Kryder
- 1999: David Patterson and Randy Katz and Garth Gibson
- 1998: Jean-Pierre Lazzari
- 1997: Alan Shugart
- 1996: Nobutake Imamura
- 1995: James U. Lemke
- 1994: Charles Denis Mee
- 1993: John M. Harker

== See also ==
- List of computer-related awards
- List of computer science awards
