= Adrian Mihai Ionescu =

Romanian-Swiss academic

- Education: Politehnica University of Bucharest; National Polytechnic Institutes (France)
- Scientific career
- Fields: Silicon nanotechnology, Energy efficient steep slope switches, Phase change materials and devices, integrated biosensors, neuromorphic devices, semiconducting SOI qubits, Edge AI electronics, Digital Twins for healthcare
- Workplaces: Swiss Federal Institute of Technology in Lausanne

Adrian Mihai Ionescu is a Romanian and Swiss physicist and academic. He is full Professor at the Swiss Federal Institute of Technology in Lausanne (EPFL), where he is founder and director of the Nanoelectronic Devices Laboratory. Starting in November 2025, he was appointed Dean of the School of Engineering at the École Polytechnique Fédérale de Lausanne (EPFL).

== Education ==
He received the B.S./M.S. degree in electronics and telecommunications, and the Ph.D. in microelectronics from the Polytechnic Institute of Bucharest, Romania in 1989 and 1994, respectively. He obtained a second PhD in semiconductor physics from the National Polytechnic Institute of Grenoble, France, in 1997.

== Career ==
He has held staff and/or visiting positions at CEA-Leti, Grenoble, France, LPCS-ENSERG, Grenoble, France and Stanford University, US, in 1998 and 1999. He was a visiting professor at the Tokyo Institute of Technology in 2012 and 2016.

He is the founder and director of the Nanoelectronic Devices Laboratory of EPFL.

He is an IEEE Fellow since 2016 for contributions to the development of novel devices for low power applications, and a member of the Swiss Academy of Engineering Sciences (SATW), from which he received the Outstanding Achievement Award in 2015.

In 2025, he was elected as a member of Academia Europaea (www.ae-info.org).

More than 600 of his articles were, as of 2023, published in scientific journals and conference proceedings. He is co-founder and a member of the Board of Directors of Xsensio SA, a start-up developing wearable biosensors.

== Field of research ==
Adrian Ionescu's research in beyond CMOS steep slope devices is seminal. He pioneered the demonstration of tunneling field-effect transistors (TFETs) with enhanced turn-on/off steepness using the principle of band-to-band tunneling injection. He has also made groundbreaking contributions in the field of internal gain devices using negative capacitance effect, to accomplish steep turn-on/off qualities. Other research interests and contributions include phase change materials and devices for neuromorphic computing, MEMS/NEMS for radiofrequency and sensing applications, and, fully-depleted Silicon-On-Insulator semiconducting qubits. As one of Europe's leading scholars in the field of micro- and nanoelectronics, he has paid constant attention to linking fundamental research to societal needs. His technical contributions range from nano-mechanical devices to futuristic post-MOSFET transistors with ultra-low power functionality. His recent venture, DIGIPREDICT, uses digital twin technology and energy-efficient sensors to detect biomarkers in human biofluids and predict the trajectory of diseases like sepsis and COVID-19. He has combined an experimental, analytic approach with remarkably original insights to fundamentally advance the understanding of electron devices and technology.

== Honors and awards ==
- 2024 IEEE Cledo Brunetti Award for "leadership and contributions to the field of energy-efficient steep slope devices and technologies".
- IEEE George E. Smith Award 2017.
- In 2016 he received the prestigious Advanced ERC (European Research Council) Grant for individual senior scientists in Europe to develop a 5-year research programs aiming at 100 millivolt switches and sensors for Internet-of-Things.
- Outstanding Achievement Award of Swiss Academy of Technical Sciences in 2015.
- Recipient of the IBM Faculty Award in Engineering in 2013.
- André Blondel Medal 2009: for remarkable contributions to the progress in engineering sciences in the domain of electronics from the Society of Electrical and Electronics Engineering (SEE, Paris), France.
- Annual Award of the Romanian Academy of Technical Sciences, 1994, for contributions to SOI technology.

== Publications ==
- Ionescu, Adrian M.; Riel, Heike (16 November 2011). "Tunnel field-effect transistors as energy-efficient electronic switches". Nature. 479 (7373): 329–337. Bibcode:2011Natur.479..329I. doi:10.1038/nature10679. PMID 22094693.
- Boucart, Kathy; Ionescu, Adrian M. (25 June 2007). "Double-Gate Tunnel FET With High-κ Gate Dielectric". IEEE Transactions on Electron Devices. 54 (7): 1725–1733. doi:10.1109/TED.2007.899389.
- Boucart, Kathy; Ionescu, Adrian M. (2007). "Length scaling of the Double Gate Tunnel FET with a high-K gate dielectric". Solid-State Electronics. 51 (11–12): 1500–1507. Bibcode:2007SSEle..51.1500B. doi:10.1016/j.sse.2007.09.014.
- Rusu, Alexandru; Salvatore, Giovanni A.; Jiménez, David; Ionescu, Adrian M. (6 December 2010). Metal-Ferroelectric-Meta-Oxide-semiconductor field effect transistor with sub-60mV/decade subthreshold swing and internal voltage amplification. 2010 International Electron Devices Meeting. San Francisco, CA, USA: IEEE. pp. 16.3.1–16.3.4. doi:10.1109/IEDM.2010.5703374.
- Sheibani, Shokoofeh; Capua, Luca; Kamaei, Sadegh; Afyouni Akbari, Sayedeh Shirin; Zhang, Junrui; Guerin, Hoel; Ionescu, Adrian M. (19 January 2021). "Extended gate field-effect-transistor for sensing cortisol stress hormone". Communications Materials. 2 (10) 10. Bibcode:2021CoMat...2...10S. doi:10.1038/s43246-020-00114-x. PMC 7815575. PMID 33506228.
