= Emerson Pugh =

American research engineer and scientist (1929–2024)

Emerson W. Pugh
- Born: May 1, 1929; Pasadena, California, United States
- Died: December 8, 2024 (aged 95); Cold Spring, New York, U.S.
- Education: Carnegie Tech
- Scientific career
- Fields: Computing
- Workplaces: Carnegie Tech; IBM

Emerson W. Pugh (May 1, 1929 – December 8, 2024) was an American research engineer and scientist, whose career at IBM spanned several decades and resulted in significant technological advances. He was a leader in magnetic and computer memory technologies and authored several books, including college-level physics textbooks and historical works on IBM.

== Biography ==
Pugh was born in Pasadena, California into a family of physicists. His father was Emerson M. Pugh. His brother, George E. Pugh (1926–2013, spent most of his professional career working as a (nuclear and research) physicist for government support companies. His mother was Ruth E. Pugh.

In 1930, his family moved to Pittsburgh, Pennsylvania, where he was raised. In 1941, he suffered from poliomyelitis, and recovered after months of hospitalization. After rehabilitation he was able to skip two grades at the Edgewood Public School. He was a bright pupil in high school, with remarkable results on a algebra test. That got him a full-tuition scholarship for Dartmouth College. The second year he transferred to the Carnegie Institute of Technology, where he developed himself not only as a great student, but a fine debater too. He received his bachelors-degree in 1951, followed by his doctors-degree in physics in 1956. He remained one more year at Carnegie's to teach physics and coauthoring, with his father, a widely used college text book, published in 1960 with the title: “Principles of Electricity and Magnetism.”

== Career at IBM ==
Pugh began working at the IBM research facility in 1957. After several months he was named manager of the Metals Physics Group. The group's research led to the development of the thin magnetic film array used in the IBM System/360. They also developed computer-memory techniques including magnetic bubble memory and began development of a word processor for the Japanese language.

Pugh produced four books on IBM history and development of its products. He retired from IBM in 1993.

== Activity with IEEE ==
While still working at IBM, Pugh was active in the Institute of Electrical and Electronics Engineers. His first presentation was in 1964, and in 1965 he became a senior member of IEEE. He was named editor of IEEE Transactions on Magnetics in 1968. He was president of the Magnetics Society (1973–74), then Division Director, Executive Vice President, and VP of Technical Activities. In 1989 he was elected President of IEEE. He was also active on the IEEE History Committee and was one of the trustees of the History Center. He served as President of the IEEE Foundation (2000–04).

While serving on the IEEE History Committee (2009), Pugh created the STARS program with the IEEE History Center.

== Partial bibliography ==
- Principles of Electricity and Magnetism
- Building IBM
- IBM's 360 and Early 370 Systems
