= Amy Dommel-Dieny =

French musicologist and composer

Amy Dommel-Diény (1894–1981) was a French musicologist and composer. She was a professor of harmony and counterpoint at the Schola Cantorum de Paris and at the Conservatoire de Strasbourg. She is the author of many books on music and music composition. In 1948, she published Le Cœur en Fête, a collection of popular songs, psalms and hymns. In 1973, she published a new version of Gabriel Fauré's sonata for piano and violin. She also had correspondence with Charles Koechlin and Gabriel Marcel.

== Bibliography ==
- 1919: Chansons et contes, preface by Vincent d'Indy
- 1939: L'Histoire de mes poupées, four-handed suite for children, Paris
- 1951: Trois Improvisations, Paris, Leduc
- 1957: 300 leçons d'harmonie et exercices gradués, Neuchâtel, Delachaux et Niestlé
- 1960: Contrepoint et harmonie, Neuchâtel, Delachaux et Niestlé.
- 1960: L'Harmonie vivante, Paris, Delachaux et Niestlé, 1960.
- 1974: Abrégé d'harmonie tonale
- 1977: Étude sur la Première Sonate pour clavecin et flûte en si mineur de Bach, Sceaux
- 1980: De l'analyse harmonique à l'interprétation, Paris
- 1981: L'Écriture musicale tonale, Paris
- 1984: Il Capello, Lyon
