= Guohan Hu =

Electrical engineer

- Education: Ph.D. from Cornell University
- Occupation: Electrical engineering
- Known for: Researching magnetoresistive RAM
- Awards: IEEE Fellow

Guohan Hu is an electrical engineer specializing in magnetic storage and spintronics, and especially in the use of spin-transfer torque in magnetoresistive RAM, a type of non-volatile random-access memory. She works for IBM Research at the Thomas J. Watson Research Center as a distinguished research staff member and manager of the MRAM Materials and Devices group.

Hu has a Ph.D. from Cornell University, completed in 2002. She was elected as an IEEE Fellow in 2022, "for contributions to Spin-Transfer-Torque MRAM materials and devices". She was named a Fellow of the American Physical Society in 2023, "for pioneering advancements in the development of materials and devices for spin-transfer torque magnetic random access memory, resulting in breakthroughs that have significantly enhanced the performance, scalability, and reliability of next-generation non-volatile memory technologies".
