= Jean-Pierre Diény =

French sinologist (1927–2014)

Jean-Pierre Diény (14 August 1927 – 3 May 2014) was a French sinologist. He was born in Colmar, and first trained as a classicist, but, having received a grant from the Thiers Foundation, switched to the study of Chinese literature at the Institut national des langues et civilisations orientales in 1955. Having spent time working in Japan, Paris, Beijing and Hong Kong between 1959 and 1967, Diény returned to Paris for good in 1967 as a research fellow, first at the French National Centre for Scientific Research (CNRS), and subsequently, in 1969, at the École pratique des hautes études (EPHE). He was promoted to full researcher (French: directeur d’études) at the EPHE in 1970, where he taught until 1997. The book collections of Diény and his wife Colette - herself a sinologist with particular focus on Chinese science - were left to the National Academic Library in Strasbourg.

== Selected works ==
The two-volume Festschrift in Diény's honour contains a full bibliography of his works.

- Diény, Jean-Pierre (1963). Les dix-neuf poèmes anciens (in French). Presses Universitaires de France.
- Diény, Jean-Pierre (1968). Aux origines de la poésie classique en Chine: Étude sur la poésie lyrique à l'époque des Han (in French). Leiden: E.J. Brill.
- Diény, Jean-Pierre (2012). Images et représentations du monde dans la Chine ancienne: choix d'études (1962-2006) (in French). Institut des hautes études chinoises. ISBN 978-2-85757-071-4. This is an anthology of most of Diény's published works.

== Personal life ==
Diény married Colette Pabst in 1958, and they had four children.
