= Alexander M. Poniatoff =

Russian-American founder of Ampex (1892–1980)

- Poniatoff, c. 1962
- Born: 25 March 1892; Russko-Tatarskaya Aysha, Russia
- Died: 24 October 1980 (aged 88)
- Occupation: Electrical engineer
- Known for: Founder of AMPEX Data Systems Corporation

Alexander Matveevich Poniatoff (Russian: Александр Матвеевич Понятов, romanized: Aleksandr Matveyevich Ponyatov; 25 March 1892 – 24 October 1980) was a Russian-born American electrical engineer, inventor and entrepreneur. He was the founder of Ampex Data Systems Corporation

== Biography ==
Poniatoff was born in 1892 in Russko-Tatarskaya Aysha in Kazan Governorate of the Russian Empire. He emigrated from Russia to China, where he worked for the Shanghai Power Company, until he emigrated to the United States in 1927. He would subsequently work for General Electric, the Pacific Gas and Electric Company and Dalmo-Victor.

In 1944, he founded Ampex, using his initials A.M.P. plus "ex" for "excellence" to create the name. The high-frequency bias technique, which made quality recording possible, was invented by Telefunken engineers and put into practical use by Poniatoff.

Danish engineer Valdemar Poulsen's original magnetic recorder was previously only usable for telephony recording. In 1956, Ampex engineers created the world's first rotary head recorder, the VR-1000 videotape recorder. Poniatoff served as president of Ampex until 1955, when he was elected chairman of the board.

Poniatoff died on 24 October 1980, aged 88.
