= Bernard Dieny =

Research scientist and entrepreneur

- Occupations: Research scientist and entrepreneur
- Awards: IBM Outstanding achievement award for development of spin-valves Applied Physics Award, the French Society of Physics; Award of innovative idea and innovative technology from CEA; Adrien Constantin de Magny Prize from Académie des Sciences; Achievement Award, IEEE Magnetics Society

Academic background
- Education: Agrégation de physique Doctorate in Physics; Habilitation à diriger des Recherches
- Alma mater: Ecole Normale Supérieure de Cachan; University Joseph Fourier, Grenoble

Academic work
- Institutions: CNRS/Lab Louis Néel, CEA/IRIG/SPINTEC

Bernard Dieny is a research scientist and an entrepreneur. He is Chief Scientist at SPINTEC (Spintronics and Technology of Components), a CEA/CNRS/UGA research laboratory that he co-founded in 2002 in Grenoble, France. He is also co-founder of two startup companies: Crocus Technology on MRAM and magnetic sensors in 2006 and EVADERIS on circuits design in 2014.

Dieny has published over 480 papers and has 77 patents awarded. His main research interests center around magnetism and spin electronics, including spintronics phenomena, spintronic materials and applications, particularly memory (MRAM) devices, interfacial magnetism, perpendicular magnetic anisotropy, hybrid CMOS/magnetic technology, magnetic recording technology and magnetic biotechnologies. He received two advanced research grants from the European Research Council (ERC) focused on the design, fabrication and evaluation of ultra-low power and multifunctional spintronic circuits particularly suitable for the Internet of Things.

Dieny is a Fellow of IEEE Magnetics Society. He founded the French Chapter of the society in 2006.

== Education ==
Dieny received "Agrégation de physique" from Ecole Normale Supérieure de Cachan in 1982. He then enrolled at the University Joseph Fourier, and earned his Doctorate in Physics in 1985, and completed his Habilitation à diriger des Recherches in 2005.

== Career ==
Dieny started his career as a Permanent junior Researcher at CNRS/ Laboratoire de magnétisme Louis Néel in 1988. He was then hired at CEA/Grenoble as Permanent Researcher in 1992. He became head of "Nanostructures and Magnetism" laboratory from 1996 till 2001. In 2002, he cofounded SPINtronics and TEchnology of Components (SPINTEC) of which he has been Deputy Head till 2015. He also served as Senior expert and Research Director at CEA. He is currently SPINTEC Chief Scientist.

== Research ==
Dieny has focused his research on magnetism and spin electronics, and has received two Advanced Research grants from the European Research Council in 2009 and 2014 related to hybrid CMOS/Magnetic Integrated Electronics. For his research in the field, he was also awarded the De Magny Prize from French Academy of Sciences in 2015 and the IEEE Magnetics Society Achievement Award in 2019.

=== Magnetic recording technology ===
In his studies focused on the potential of Giant Magnetoresistance (GMR) for read-heads, Dieny demonstrated that sandwiches comprising two uncoupled ferromagnetic layers, one of pinned magnetization, the other of free magnetization, could exhibit the GMR sensitivity required for read-head applications. He along with his team coined the name spin-valves to these systems. He is the co-inventor of the first seven patents related to spin-valves, for which he was awarded an outstanding achievement award from IBM for this work in 1992, and was interviewed in relation to this work at the Computer History Museum in Mountain View in 2018. Dieny also developed a modeling tool based on Fuchs Sondheimer theory allowing the calculation of the resistance and GMR of any spin-valve structures from the microscopic transport parameters. This tool has been widely used in the recording industry to speed-up the optimization of spin-valve read-heads.

=== Spinelectronics ===
Dieny has pioneered several very important fields in spintronics. In 1995, he participated to the worldwide first realization of spin-electronic devices combining semiconductor and magnetic layers: the spin-valve transistor. This work carried out in collaboration with Twente University, had a very strong impact and stimulated lot of subsequent studies in the field of Ballistic Electron Emission Microscopy (BEEM). He has also filed about 60 patents related to MRAM, some being key since they are now used by all microelectronic companies producing MRAM. In 2002, his team discovered the phenomenon of perpendicular anisotropy at magnetic metal/oxide interfaces. Moreover, he also launched an important activity on nonvolatile logic combining CMOS (CMOS: Complementary Metal Oxide Semiconductor technology) and magnetic technologies. His team also developed the design tools from individual cells level to system level required to conceive spintronic circuits. Along this line, they designed and successfully tested MRAM blocks, FPGA circuits, and microcontrollers.

In 2015, he proposed a novel approach for the nanopatterning of MRAM cells at high density and narrow pitch opening the route towards multi-gigabit MRAM chips. His team also proposed and demonstrated a novel concept of MRAM utilizing a perpendicular shape anisotropy of the storage layer to increase the memory retention at advanced technology nodes (sub 20 nm).

=== Magnetism and Microelectronics Communities ===
Dieny has worked to strengthen the relationships between magnetism and microelectronics communities. In 2013, he launched an annual Introductory Course on Magnetic Random Access Memory "InMRAM". Along the same line, with the strong support of Samsung Electronics, he organizes every year a MRAM Global Innovation Forum at IEDM, the main annual conference of microelectronics sponsored by the IEEE Electron Devices Society.

=== Magnetism and biotechnology ===
In 2012, Dieny launched a new activity at SPINTEC related to the use of magnetic nanoparticles in biotechnology and biomedicine. In collaboration with other labs at CEA/DRF/IRIG and a team at INSERM, his team demonstrated in-vitro, the possibility to trigger the apoptosis (spontaneous death) of cancer cells as well as to stimulate the production of insulin by pancreatic cells thanks to the low frequency (~20 Hz) mechanical vibrations of magnetic particles in contact with the cells. These studies are now pursued in-vivo in collaboration with INSERM and CHU Grenoble.

== Awards/honors ==
- 1992 - IBM Outstanding achievement award for development of spin-valves
- 2000 - Applied Physics Award, the French Society of Physics
- 2002 - Award of innovative idea and innovative technology from CEA
- 2006 - Finalist of Descartes Research Prize, European Council
- 2009 - Recipient of European Research Council Advanced grant, HYMAGINE (Hybrid CMOS/Magnetic integrated electronics)
- 2010 - Elevated to IEEE Fellow within the IEEE Magnetics Society
- 2012 - Recipient of European Research Council Proof of Concept grant (ERC PoC), DESHYMAG (Towards a fabless start-up of design of hybrid CMOS/magnetic digital circuits).
- 2014 - Recipient of European Research Council Advanced grant (ERC Adv Grant), MAGICAL (CMOS/Magnetoelectronic Integrated Circuits with Multifunctional Capabilities)
- 2015 - Adrien Constantin de Magny Prize from Académie des Sciences
- 2019 - Achievement Award, IEEE Magnetics Society
- 2019 - Recipient of European Research Council Proof of Concept grant (ERC PoC), MAGALIGN (Magnetic Alignment for high precision 3D Assembly)
- 2025 - Knight of the Legion of Honor.

== Bibliography ==
- Dieny, B.; Speriosu, V. S.; Parkin, S. S. P.; Gurney, B. A.; Wilhoit, D. R.; Mauri, D. (1991). "Giant magnetoresistive in soft ferromagnetic multilayers". Physical Review B. 43 (1): 1297–1300. Bibcode:1991PhRvB..43.1297D. doi:10.1103/physrevb.43.1297. PMID 9996352.
- Dieny, B.; Speriosu, V. S.; Metin, S.; Parkin, S. S. P.; Gurney, B. A.; Baumgart, P.; Wilhoit, D. R. (15 April 1991). "Magnetotransport properties of magnetically soft spin-valve structures (invited)". Journal of Applied Physics. 69 (8): 4774–4779. Bibcode:1991JAP....69.4774D. doi:10.1063/1.348252.
- Dieny, B. (September 1994). "Giant magnetoresistance in spin-valve multilayers". Journal of Magnetism and Magnetic Materials. 136 (3): 335–359. Bibcode:1994JMMM..136..335D. doi:10.1016/0304-8853(94)00356-4.
- Houssameddine, D.; Ebels, U.; Delaët, B.; Rodmacq, B.; Firastrau, I.; Ponthenier, F.; Brunet, M.; Thirion, C.; Michel, J.-P.; Prejbeanu-Buda, L.; Cyrille, M.-C.; Redon, O.; Dieny, B. (June 2007). "Spin-torque oscillator using a perpendicular polarizer and a planar free layer". Nature Materials. 6 (6): 447–453. Bibcode:2007NatMa...6..447H. doi:10.1038/nmat1905. PMID 17468761.
- Yang, H. X.; Chshiev, M.; Dieny, B.; Lee, J. H.; Manchon, A.; Shin, K. H. (August 2011). "First-principles investigation of the very large perpendicular magnetic anisotropy at Fe | MgO and Co | MgO interfaces". Physical Review B. 84 (5) 054401. arXiv:1011.5667. Bibcode:2011PhRvB..84e4401Y. doi:10.1103/PhysRevB.84.054401.
