= Christopher H. Bajorek =

Data storage engineer, inventor, technology leader (b. 1943, d. -)

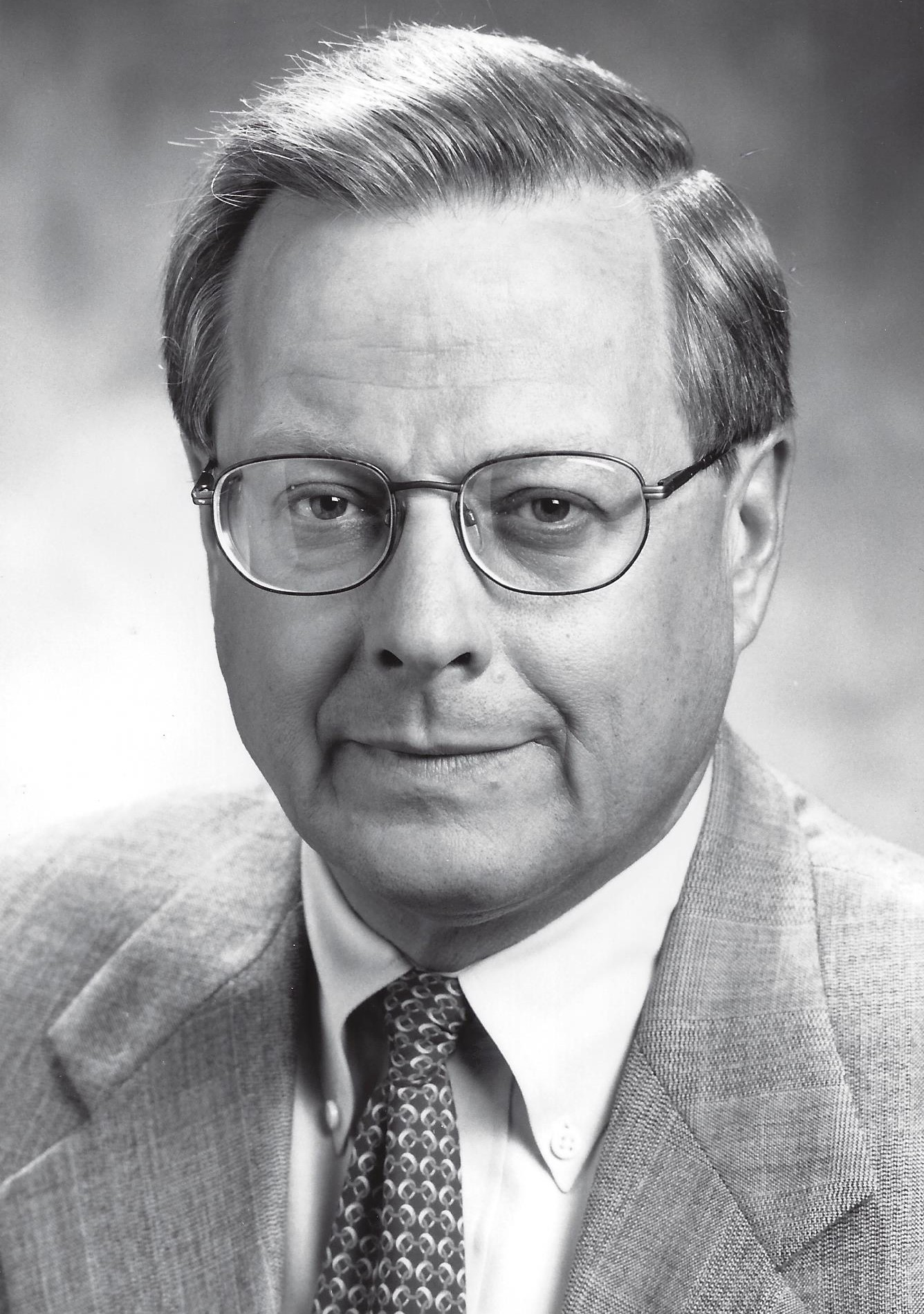
- Christopher H. Bajorek
- Born: November 26, 1943 (age 82); Tel Aviv, Mandatory Palestine
- Education: Pasadena City College, Caltech
- Occupations: engineer, business executive
- Employer(s): IBM, Komag Inc.
- Spouse: Janet Fullmer
- Children: Peter C., Jennifer L.
- Parent(s): George L. H., Rosalia (Lipka) B.
- Awards: IEEE Reynold B. Johnson Information Storage Systems Award, 2002; IEEE Millenium Medal, 2000; Fellow Institute of Electrical and Electronics Engineers, 1990

Christopher Henry Bajorek (born November 26, 1943) is a data storage engineer noted for his leadership in developing and implementing magnetoresistive sensors into magnetic stripe readers, tape drives and hard disk drives.

== Early life and education ==
Christopher Henry Bajorek was born in Tel Aviv, Mandatory Palestine, on November 26, 1943. His parents were George L. H. (POW Kolyma, Russia, 1940–42) and Rosalia (Lipka) B. (POW Kazakhstan, Russia, 1940–42); He married Janet Fullmer in 1965. They have two children: Peter C. and Jennifer L.
Bajorek attended Pasadena City College before transferring to the California Institute of Technology, Pasadena, California, where he received a Bachelor of Science (B.S.) degree in 1967, a Master of Science (M.S.), in electrical engineering (EE) in 1968; and a Ph.D. in electrical engineering in 1972 all from Caltech. He now resides in Los Gatos, California.

== Career ==
Bajorek joined IBM Yorktown in 1971 becoming part of the research effort led by David Thompson and Lubomyr Romankiw studying readback devices based on magnetoresistance. Bajorek made numerous contributions. The collaboration between IBM Yorktown and the IBM product divisions, led to these magnetoresistive devices becoming ubiquitous in reading magnetic stripe cards (Credit/Debit cards, transportation tickets, identity cards etc.) and in digital tape recording and in hard disk drives. The point-of-sale hand-held magnetoresistive transducer represented the first commercialization of the effect discovered by Lord Kelvin in 1856.

In 1979, Bajorek took a one-year assignment in IBM's East Fishkill and contributed to the development of IBM's bipolar logic chip and multilayer ceramic packaging technologies used in the IBM 360 mainframes. Based on this experience, Bajorek established the Advanced Packaging Technology Laboratory (APTL) and was appointed its first director in 1980. This collaboration between East Fishkill and the Thomas J. Watson Research Center was IBM's second interdivisional lab. to be established.

In 1981, Bajorek transferred from the IBM Thomas J. Watson Research Center, Yorktown Heights, NY to the San Jose Research Center (now IBM Research – Almaden) in California where he was appointed director of storage systems and technology. He also co-founded IBM's Magnetic Recording Institute (MRI) with Denis Mee. Mee was its first director and Bajorek became its second director in 1984 when he transferred to the IBM General Product Division (GPD). This was the third of IBM's interdivisional laboratories to be established. This time between GPD and the San Jose Research Center. The APTL and MRI collaborations were among the first of eventually 19 joint programs at IBM specifically instigated by Ralph Gomory and designed to bridge between the Research and the Development organizations.

In 1985, Bajorek was appointed laboratory director of technology development and manufacturing for GPD, San Jose, responsible for MRI as well as head and disk development and manufacturing. In this role, Bajorek directed the development of the first generation MR head for disk drives and the industry's first MR head-based disk drive, the Sawmill 5 ¼ in. drive, which shipped in 1990. Bajorek also contributed directly to the technology with innovations such as shunted soft adjacent layer (SAL) for linearizing the MR head response and antiferromagnetic (AFM)-based pinning of soft layers; and longitudinal permanent magnet biasing of the free layer to achieve single domain (Barkhausen noise free) operation of MR heads. These innovations were key to the success of subsequent generations of MR heads, the GMR and TMR heads. In 1987, Bajorek transferred to IBM Rochester, MN and was appointed director of storage products. He was responsible for developing and manufacturing small form factor drive products as well as being responsible for developing technologies used by IBM Fujisawa, Japan and IBM Hursley, UK disk drives. Noteworthy were IBM's first thin-film disk used in the 5 ¼ in. Lee drive, shipped in 1988; the first PRML data channel designed for hard drives which was used in Hursley's 5 ¼ in. Redwing drive, shipped in 1990; and the industry's second MR head-based disk drive, the Corsair 3 ½ in drive, shipped in 1991. Corsair was the industry's first 3 ½ in. drive to achieve 1 GB data capacity

In 1991, Bajorek returned to San Jose becoming vice president of technology development and Manufacturing responsible for all technologies used in IBM's disk drives.
In 1996, Bajorek retired from IBM and joined Komag, Inc. in San Jose, California, as executive vice president of advanced technology. Bajorek retired from Komag in 2004. Since that time he has served as director of the International Disk Drive Equipment & Materials Association. He has also been an expert witness in several cases notably the patent infringement brought by Carnegie Mellon University (CMU) against Marvell Technologies that resulted in a $750 million settlement. Bajorek is a member of the Storage Special Interest Group at the Computer History Museum, Mountain View, California.

== Litigation with IBM ==
After Bajorek joined Komag, in a precedent-setting case, IBM attempted to clawback monies received by Bajorek from vesting stock options citing a non-compete clause signed by Bajorek. At issue were whether Komag was a competitor or supplier to IBM and whether the non-compete clause could be enforced under California State law. Bajorek won the Federal lower court case via a declaratory judgment in 1997. However, in 1999, this was overturned when IBM appealed to the Federal Court of Appeals, Ninth Circuit, in San Francisco, CA. This led to a settlement between Komag and IBM and left the Ninth Circuit Court's Decision as precedent. Finally, however, in 2008, in a different case, California's Supreme Court specifically rejected the Ninth Circuit's IBM vs. Bajorek decision, viewing it as illegal under California law.

== Awards and recognition ==
- 1990: Bajorek became an IEEE Fellow "For leadership in the development and manufacture of magnetic data storage and high-speed computer switching devices".
- 2000: Bajorek received the IEEE Millenium Medal for his "outstanding achievements and contributions".
- 2002: Bajorek received the IEEE Reynold B. Johnson Award as a "major contributor and a leader in the prototyping, development, manufacturing and application of magnetoresistive recording heads in the data storage industry".

Only three people have won both the Millenium medal and the Johnson award: Charles Denis Mee, Mark Kryder, and Christopher H. Bajorek.

As of 2019 Bajorek is the author of 14 scientific publications and is an assignee on 24 patents.
