= Mark Kryder =

American computer engineer

Mark Howard Kryder (born October 7, 1943 in Portland, Oregon) was Seagate Corp.'s senior vice president of research and chief technology officer. Kryder holds a Bachelor of Science degree in electrical engineering from Stanford University and a Ph.D. in electrical engineering and physics from the California Institute of Technology.

Kryder was elected a member of the National Academy of Engineering in 1994 for contributions to the understanding of magnetic domain behavior and for leadership in information storage research.

He is known for "Kryder's law", an observation from the mid-2000s about the increasing capacity of magnetic hard drives.

== Kryder's law projection ==
A 2005 Scientific American article, titled "Kryder's Law", described Kryder's observation that magnetic disk areal storage density was then increasing at a rate exceeding Moore's Law. The pace was then much faster than the two-year doubling time of semiconductor chip density posited by Moore's law.

Inside of a decade and a half, hard disks had increased their capacity 1,000-fold, a rate that Intel founder Gordon Moore himself has called "flabbergasting."

— Kryder's Law

In 2005, commodity drive density of 110 Gbit/in^{2} (170 Mbit/mm^{2}) had been reached, up from 100 Mbit/in^{2} (155 Kbit/mm^{2}) circa 1990. This does not extrapolate back to the initial 2 kilobit/in^{2} (3.1 bit/mm^{2}) drives introduced in 1956, as growth rates surged during the latter 15-year period.

In 2009, Kryder projected that if hard drives were to continue to progress at their then-current pace of about 40% per year, then in 2020 a two-platter, 2.5-inch disk drive would store approximately 40 terabytes (TB) and cost about $40.

The validity of the Kryder's law projection of 2009 was questioned halfway into the forecast period, and some called the actual rate of areal density progress the "Kryder rate". As of 2014, the observed Kryder rate had fallen well short of the 2009 forecast of 40% per year. A single 2.5-inch platter stored around 0.3 terabytes in 2009 and this reached 0.6 terabytes in 2014. The Kryder rate over the five years ending in 2014 was around 15% per year. To reach 20 terabytes by 2020, starting in 2014, would have required an implausibly high Kryder rate of better than 80% per year.

By 2019, it was observed that Kryder's law "has proven to be outdated as the cost of media storage is decreasing at a slower pace than in the past and is now stabilising."

== Awards and honors ==
Mark H. Kryder is an elected member of the National Academy of Engineering, a Fellow of the American Physical Society. and a Fellow of the Institute of Electrical and Electronics Engineers (IEEE). He was Distinguished Lecturer for the IEEE Magnetics Society, and has been awarded the IEEE Magnetics Society Achievement Award and IEEE Reynold B. Johnson Information Storage Systems Award. Kryder received the Pingat Bakti Masyarakat from Singapore in their 2007 National Day Awards.
