= Charles Denis Mee =

British data storage engineer and author (1927–2023)

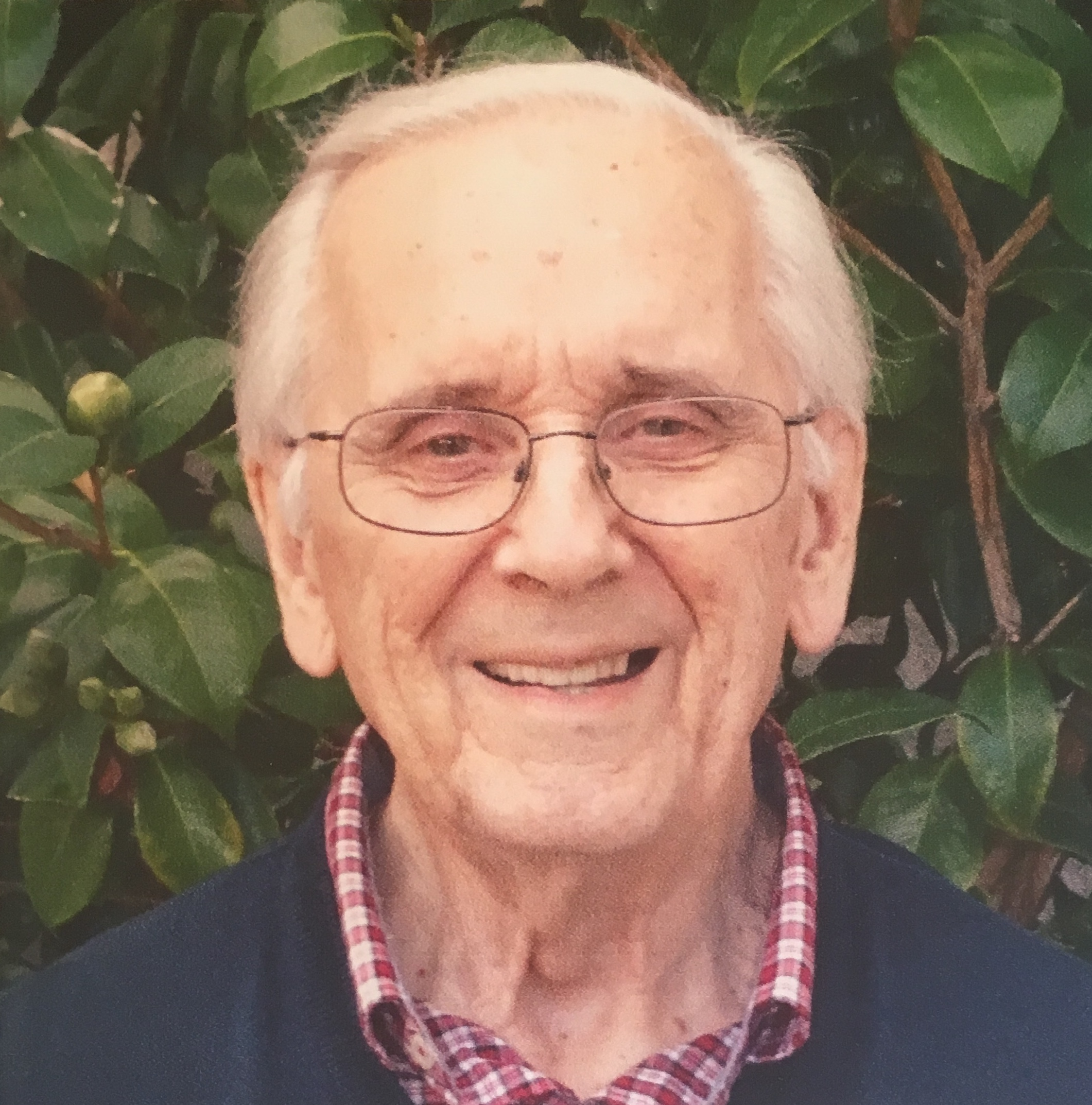
- Charles Denis Mee
- Born: December 28, 1927; Loughborough, England
- Died: May 22, 2023 (aged 95); Saratoga, California, U.S.
- Education: University of Nottingham, University of London
- Occupations: Engineer, physicist, author
- Employer(s): CBS, IBM
- Awards: IRE Audio Society Achievement award, 1964; IBM Fellow 1983; IEEE Reynold B. Johnson Information Storage Systems Award, 1994; Fellow Institute of Electrical and Electronics Engineers; Member National Academy of Engineering 1996

Charles Denis Mee (December 28, 1927 – May 22, 2023) was a British-American engineer, physicist, and author who was noted for his contributions in the areas of magnetic recording and data storage on hard disk drives (HDD). A large part of his career was with IBM in San Jose California. He is the author or editor of several books on magnetic recording.

== Background ==
Charles Denis Mee (Denis) was born on December 28, 1927, in Loughborough, England. He married his childhood sweetheart, Molly (née Orchard) in 1951. They emigrated to the US in 1957 and settled in Los Gatos CA in 1965. They have one son Robert.

Mee received a Bachelor of Science degree from the University of London in 1948. In 1951, he obtained a Doctor of Philosophy degree from the University of Nottingham. In 1967, he was awarded a Doctor of Science degree also from the University of Nottingham.

== Career ==
From 1951 to 1957, Denis Mee worked for M.S.S. in Colnbrook, UK in the field of Magnetics. In 1957, he emigrated to the United States to join Columbia Broadcasting System Laboratories where he became Technical Director of the Magnetics Group. In 1964, he received the IRE Audio Society Award for his work on high-density audio stereo tape recording (a precursor to the consumer audio cassette tape).

Mee joined IBM Research at Yorktown Heights in 1962 as a research staff member. Three years later, he transferred to the IBM Advanced Technology group in San Jose, California. He subsequently contributed to and managed several ground-breaking data storage technology programs such as thin-film heads for hard disk drives and several types of optical storage technologies.

In 1982 Mee was a co-founder and first director of IBM's Magnetic Recording Institute, one of the first of 19 joint programs at IBM, in this case focused on storage technology. He was appointed IBM Fellow in 1983. Mee retired from IBM in 1993 and has since been a consultant to and participant in joint industry-university magnetic and optical data storage programs.

Mee led IBM's efforts in the early 1980s to establish University Research Centers in magnetic and optical storage including ones at the Center for Magnetic Recording Research (CMRR) at UC San Diego and the Data Storage Systems Center (DSSC) at Carnegie Mellon University. He was a co-founder and first chairman of the board of the National Storage Industry Consortium (now Information Storage Industry Consortium, INSIC) founded in 1991 to enhance industry competitiveness thru cooperation between universities and industry. Mee was one of the founding members of and has been a major contributor to the Storage Special Interest Group at the Computer History Museum, Mountain View, California.

== Personal life and death ==
Charles Denis Mee died in Saratoga, California on 22 May 2023, at the age of 95.

Mee's son, Robert C. Mee, is the founder and CEO of Pivotal Software.

== Awards and recognition ==
In 1964, Mee received the Institute of Radio Engineers (IRE) Audio Society Award "for outstanding work on high-density audio stereo tape recording". He was made a Fellow of the Institute of Electrical and Electronics Engineers for his "extraordinary record of accomplishments" in 1970. He was also placed on the IT History Society Honor Roll as a "key technologist and pioneer in the computer industry". He received an IBM Corporate Recognition Award in 1980. Denis Mee became an IBM Fellow in 1983. In 1994 he received the IEEE Reynold B. Johnson Information Storage Systems Award "for contributions to the design of optical, magneto-optical, and magnetic recording files". In 1996, he became a member of the National Academy of Engineering, a list of "the world's most accomplished engineers", for "contributions to magnetic storage and the development of thin-film heads". In 2000, he received the IEEE Magnetics Society Achievement Award. for "his technical accomplishments and his services to the magnetics community".

== Books and publications ==
Among the books Denis Mee has authored, co-authored or edited are:

- “Physics of Magnetic Recording”, North Holland Pub. Co. (1964)
- “Magnetic Recording” (3 volumes), McGraw-Hill (1987–88) edited with Eric D. Daniel
  - Vol. I : Technology
  - Vol. II : Computer Data Storage
  - Vol. III : Video, Audio & Instrumentation Recording
- "Magnetic Recording Handbook", McGraw-Hill (1989) edited with Eric D. Daniel
- "Magnetic Recording: The First 100 Years", edited with Eric D. Daniel and Mark H. Clark, Wiley-IEEE Press (1998).

Mee published about 58 books and articles which as of 2019 have been cited more than 1400 times.
