= List of hard disk manufacturers =

Diagram of consolidation

At least 218 companies have manufactured hard disk drives (HDDs) since 1956. Most of that industry has vanished through bankruptcy or mergers and acquisitions. None of the first several entrants (including IBM, who invented the HDD) continue in the industry today. Only three manufacturers have survived—Seagate, Toshiba and Western Digital (WD)—all of which grew at least in part through mergers and acquisitions.

== Manufacturers ==
The following is a partial list of hard disk manufacturers, both active and defunct. There are currently 123 manufacturers in this incomplete list.

Name	Headquarters	Year of market entry	Year of market exit	Fate	Notes	References
3M	United States	1981	1983	HDD assets sold to Disc Tech One		
Alps Electric	Japan	?	2008	HDD assets sold to TDK		
Amcodyne	United States	1983	1986	Acquired by Century Data Systems		
Ampex	United States	1970	?	?		
Anelex	United States	1964	1967	Acquired by Mohawk Data Sciences		
Areal Technology	United States	1987	1999	Acquired by Tomen Electronics and Sanyo in 1993, dissolved in 1998	Manufactured the first HDDs employing glass as the substrate for their platters	
Atasi	United States	1982	1987	Acquired by Tandon (itself acquired by Western Digital) in 1987	Considered a pioneer in the industry for developing voice-coil actuators but had financial struggles throughout its lifetime.	
Aura Associates	United States	1992	?	?		
Avatar Systems	United States	1991	1998	Bankruptcy		
BASF	Germany	1970	1982	HDD assets sold to Kennedy Company		
Brand Technologies	United States	1986	?	?		
Bryant Computer Products	United States	1959	1972	Dissolution	Renamed to XLO Computer Products in 1972	
Bull Peripheral	United States	1984	1989	Acquired by Seagate Technology	American subsidiary of CII-Honeywell-Bull	
Burroughs	United States	1964	?	?		
C. Itoh	Japan	1985	?	?		
Castlewood Systems	United States	1999	2004	Bankruptcy		
Caelus Memories	United States	1967	1969	Acquired by Electronic Memories & Magnetics		
Calcomp	United States	1972	1979	HDD assets sold to Xerox		
Calluna Technology	United Kingdom	1992	2001	Dissolution		
Cardiff Peripherals	United States	1987	?	?		
Century Data Systems	United States	1968	1972	Acquired by CalComp in 1972; later sold to Xerox in 1979		
CII-Honeywell-Bull	France	1975	1989	HDD business acquired by Seagate Technology	Resold drives through partnership with Magnetic Peripherals; CII-Honeywell-Bull was itself a joint venture between Compagnie Internationale d'Informatique, Honeywell, and Groupe Bull	
Cogito Systems	United States	1983	1985	Dissolution		
Comport	United States	1988	1991	Dissolution		
Computer Memories, Inc.	United States	1979	1986	Exited the HDD business		
Computer Memory Devices	United States	1969	1971	Dissolution		
Conner Peripherals	United States	1985	1996	Acquired by Seagate Technology		
Cornice	United States	2000	2007	Dissolution		
Data Disc	United States	1962	1977	Acquired by Datapoint		
Data General	United States	1976	1989	?		
Datapoint	United States	1977	1984	HDD assets sold to Xebec Corporation		
Dataproducts	United States	1962	?	Exited the HDD business		
Data Recording Instrument	United Kingdom	1970	1988	Acquired by FKI	First company to manufacture HDDs in Europe	
Data-Tech Memories	United States	1986	1989	Dissolution		
Diablo Systems	United States	1969	1972	Acquired by Xerox		
Digital Equipment Corporation	United States	1969	1993	Exited the HDD business		
Disc Tech One	United States	1983	1984	Acquired by Life Tech Industries		
Disctron	United States	1982	1983	Dissolution	Spin-off of Computer & Communications Technology	
DMA Systems	United States	1981	1985	Dissolution		
DZU AD	Bulgaria	1968	1999	Dissolution	Originally a state-owned entity, later converted to private company; HDD assets dispersed between 1997 and 1999	
Ecol. 2	United States	1990	1993	Dissolution	Never produced any drives beyond prototypes	
Electronic Memories & Magnetics	United States	1969	1985	Acquired by Titan Systems		
Emulex	United States	1979	1992	HDD assets spun off as QLogic		
Epson	Japan	1985	1987	Left the HDD business		
Espert	South Korea	1990	?	Dissolution		
ExcelStor Technology	China	2000	2008	Dissolution		
Fuji Electric	Japan	1985	2011	Exited the HDD business		
Fujitsu	Japan	1963	2009	HDD assets sold to Toshiba		
General Electric	United States	1962	1970	HDD assets sold to Honeywell		
GS Magicstor	China	2003	?	Dissolution		
Hewlett-Packard	United States	1979	1996	Exited the HDD business	Manufactured the first 1.3-inch HDDs	
HGST	United States	2003	2018	Acquired by Western Digital	Hitachi's HDD business after acquiring IBM's HDD assets	
Hitachi	United States	1967	2018	HDD assets sold to Western Digital		
Hokushin Electric Works	Japan	1980	?	?		
Hyosung	South Korea	?	?	?		
IBM	United States	1956	2003	HDD assets sold to Hitachi	Inventors of the HDD; HDD assets briefly spun off to AdStar between 1992 and 1995	
Imprimis (CDC)	United States	1975	1989	Acquired by Seagate Technology	Joint venture between Control Data and CII-Honeywell-Bull; Internally known as Magnetic Peripherals, Inc	
Information Storage Systems	United States	1969	1973	Acquired by Itel Corporation; later sold to Sperry Univac		
Intégral Peripherals	United States	1990	1998	Acquired by H&Q Asia Pacific	Manufactured the first 1.8-inch HDDs	
International Memories	United States	1977	1984	Merged with Onyx Systems to become Dorado Micro Systems, later Onyx-IMI; left the HDD business in 1984; HDD business sold to Fujhin Electronic Computer Co. in 1985		
Iomec	United States	1969	1975	Acquired by Data 100		
Iomega	United States	1995	2008	Acquired by EMC Corporation		
ИЗОТ (English: ISOT)	Bulgaria	1962	1991	Dissolution	State-owned entity	
Josephine County Technology	United States	1984	1986	Dissolution		
JT Storage	United States	1994	1999	Dissolution		
JVC	Japan	1986	?	?		
Kalok	United States	1987	1994	Acquired by JT Storage		
Kennedy	United States	1977	1988	Dissolution		
Kyocera	Japan	1984	1991	Exited the HDD business		
LaPine Technologies	United States	1984	1987	Bankruptcy		
Librascope	United States	1961	1968	Acquired by Singer Corporation		
Marshall Laboratories	United States	1968	1969	Dissolution		
Matsushita	Japan	1989	2000 (c.)	Exited the HDD business	Originally as a licensee of Quantum	
Maxtor	United States	1982	2006	Acquired by Seagate Technology		
Memorex	United States	1968	1981	Acquired by Burroughs Corporation; HDD assets later sold to Toshiba	Manufactured the first HDD subsystems that were plug-compatible with IBM's	
Microcomputer Memories	United States	1983	1986	Bankruptcy		
Micropolis	United States	1986	1996	HDD assets sold to Singapore Technology		
Microscience International	United States	1982	1993	Bankruptcy		
MiniScribe	United States	1980	1990	Acquired by Maxtor		
MiniStor Peripherals	United States	1991	1995	Bankruptcy	Manufactured the first PC Card HDDs	
Mitsubishi	Japan	1968	2002	HDD assets sold to Showa Denko		
Mitsumi Electric	Japan	?	?	?		
NCR	United States	1964	?	?		
NEC	Japan	1965	2002	Exited the HDD business		
Newbury Data	United Kingdom	1984	1988	Acquired by FKI		
Nippon Electric Industry	Japan	1983	?	?		
Nippon Peripherals	Japan	1971	1986	Dissolution		
Nomaï	France	1992	1998	Acquired by Iomega		
Ohio Scientific	United States	1980	1980	Acquired by M/A-COM		
Okidata	Japan	1973	1980	HDD business acquired by Ohio Scientific		
Olivetti OPE	Italy	1981	?	Left the HDD business		
Orca Technology	United States	1990	1992	Bankruptcy; HDD assets sold to Samsung Electronics in 1995		
Otari	Japan	1985	?	Exited the HDD business		
Pertec Computer	United States	1971	1987	Acquired by Triumph-Adler		
Philips	Netherlands	?	?	?		
Plus Development	United States	1983	1993	Dissolution	Inventors of the hardcard	
Potter Instrument	United States	1968	1975	Bankruptcy		
PrairieTek	United States	1985	1991	Bankruptcy	Manufactured the first 2.5-inch HDDs	
Priam	United States	1978	1991	HDD assets sold to Prima International		
Peripheral Technology	United States	1985	1990	Dissolution		
Quantum	United States	1980	2000	HDD assets sold to Maxtor		
Ricoh	Japan	1985	?	Exited the HDD business		
Rodime	United Kingdom	1979	1991	Exited the HDD business	Manufactured the first 3.5-inch HDDs	
Rotating Memory Systems	United States	1981	1982	Acquired by Computer & Communications Technology		
SAGEM	France	?	?	Exited the HDD business		
Samsung Electronics	South Korea	1988	2011	HDD assets sold to Seagate Technology		
Seagate Technology	United States	1979	Active	—N/a	Manufactured the first 5.25-inch HDDs	
Sequel	United States	1989	1991	Bankruptcy	Spin-off of Memorex's HDD business after the latter was acquired by Unisys	
Shugart Associates	United States	1979	1985	Acquired by Xerox in 1977; assets liquidated in 1985		
Siemens	Germany	?	?	?		
Storage Technology Corporation	United States	1969	2005	Acquired by Sun Microsystems		
SyQuest Technology	United States	1982	1999	HDD assets sold to Iomega		
Tandon	United States	1981	1988	HDD assets sold to Western Digital		
TEAC	Japan	?	?	?		
Texas Instruments	United States	1981	?	Exited the HDD business	First company to second-source Seagate's ST-506, the first 5.25-inch HDD	
Tokico	Japan	?	?	?		
Toshiba	Japan	1967	Active	—N/a		
Tulin	United States	1982	1991	Dissolution		
Vertex Peripherals	United States	1982	1985	Acquired by Priam Corporation		
Wangco	United States	1973	1976	Acquired by Perkin-Elmer		
Western Digital	United States	1988	Active	—N/a	Entered the industry after acquiring the hard disk drive business of Tandon Corporation	
Xebec	United States	1974	?	?	Originally named Microcomputer Systems Corporation; 1410 SASI controller formed the basis of IBM PC's hard disk controller	
YE-Data	Japan	?	1995	Exited the HDD business		

== See also ==
- History of hard disk drives
- List of computer hardware manufacturers
- List of solid-state drive manufacturers
