= Atasi Corporation =

Defunct California US hard disk drive manufacturer founded in 1981

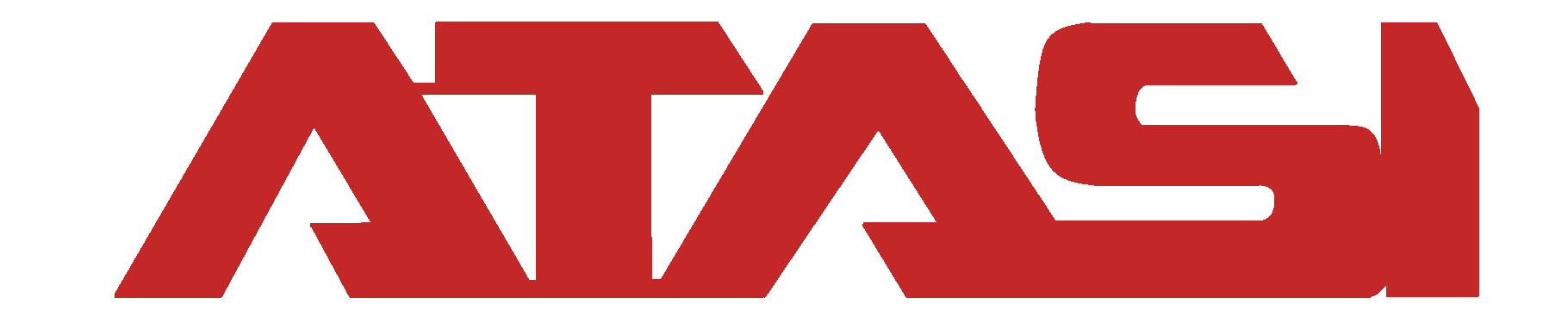
- Type: Private
- Industry: Computer storage
- Founded: February 2, 1981; 45 years ago (as Atasi Corporation)
- Founder: Frank C. Gibeau; Paul L. Farmer; Stanley F. Brown; Garold W. Plonczak
- Defunct: 1987
- Fate: Acquired by Western Digital
- Headquarters: San Jose, California
- Products: Hard disk drives
- Revenue: US$40 million (1984)
- Net income: US$15-20 million (1983)
- Number of employees: 500 (Early 1985); 85 (Late 1986); 65 (Mid 1987)

Atasi Corporation was an American 5 1/4-inch hard disk drive manufacturer company founded in California in 1981.

Atasi began selling products the following year in 1982 and was one of the first 5 1/4-inch hard disk drive manufacturers to develop and utilize closed-loop technologies such as voice-coil actuators.

Despite being considered a pioneer within its industry and having widespread adoption of its products in the high-end microcomputer market, the company had financial problems throughout its lifetime. Atasi went through failed agreements, bankruptcy, and was acquired by Tandon then Western Digital in 1987.

The company briefly reemerged with the name of Atasi Technology in 1990. Atasi Technology sold Apple compatible external hard disk drives and rebranded Priam drives until 1992.

== History ==
=== Founding as Atasi Corporation ===
Atasi was incorporated in 1981. It was principally founded by Frank C. Gibeau, while Paul L. Farmer, Stanley F. Brown, and Garold W. Plonczak were three of four other founding partners. The name "Atasi" was a Native American word for a type of club used in warfare; Gibeau, a history enthusiast, chose the name for its Native American origins.

Prior to founding Atasi, Gibeau was manager of Verbatim's hard disk drive division. He also had over 17 years of experience at companies such as IBM and Memorex.

=== Early history/Frank Gibeau era (1981-1984) ===
An Atasi 3000 series ad from Mini-Micro Systems magazine Feb 1983.

Most other hard disk drive companies at the time were using open-loop technologies such as stepper motors for controlling head movement. Stepper motors were slow and not capable of keeping up with the ever increasing capacity and density of the platters on hard disk drives. Additionally they were more prone to errors and had issues such as overheating when used for prolong periods of time. Hard drives utilizing stepper motors and band actuators like the Seagate ST-506/ST-412, had an access time of 85 ms average with up to 205ms and a 255-345 tracks per inch density.

Gibeau along with Farmer, Brown, and Plonczak developed their own closed-loop technologies to be used in their products.

==== Atasi 3000 series ====
On August 16, 1982, Atasi announced the 3000 series of 5 1/4-inch hard disk drives. There were initially three models available, the 3020 (20 MB), 3033 (33 MB), and 3046 (46 MB). The 3020 had two disk platters, while the 3033 had three and the 3046 had four. They used the ST-506 interface, which was considered the industry standard at the time after its release in 1980. The 3020 would cost $1470 upon release and the 3033 cost $1800. The Atasi 3000 drives were expected to be in final production by early 1983.

The 3000 series had a 30-60 ms access time, which was something previously only seen in bigger 8 and 14-inch hard disk drives such as the IBM 3380. The 3380 had an average access time of 16 ms and was the first hard drive to get past the 1 GB barrier in 1980. The 3000 series used linear voice coil actuators with closed-loop servo controls which allowed faster and more precise data access. They also allowed higher storage capacities, having a smaller track density of 800 tracks per inch.

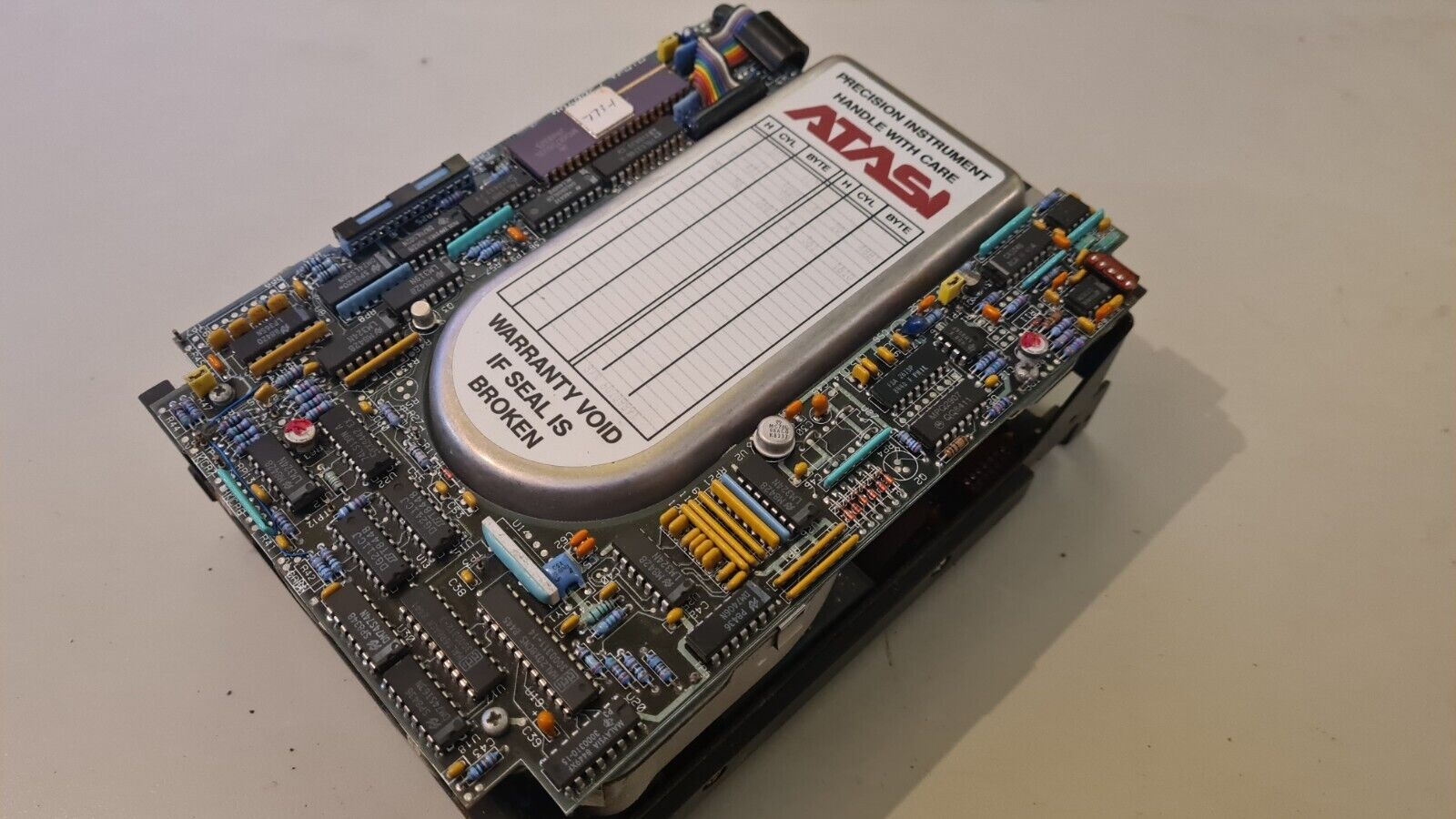
Top/side view of an Atasi 3051 drive.

In an advertisement in Personal Computing in September 1982 for the 3000 series Gibeau states:

"In the push for high capacity 5 1/4-inch disk drives, manufacturers often overlook the requirement for low access time," said Gibeau. "The combination of high capacity and fast access, achieved in the Atasi products, is vital to the new generation of multi-user, multi-tasking computer systems. It brings such applications as local area networking and computer graphics more within reach of small-business computer and office-automation equipment users."

Atasi also used other marketing methods to help its drives stand out such as offering the "Atasi White Paper". These were brochures discussing shock/vibration and temperature effects on hard disk drives and how Atasi drives mitigate those problems in its closed-loop designs.

==== Failed acquisition by Seagate ====
In October 1983, Seagate Technology announced its intent to acquire Atasi through the offer of a stock swap worth $131.4 million (7.2 million shares of Seagate worth $18.25 each, at the time). Seagate's primary reason for acquiring Atasi was to obtain the rights to the lucrative patents for Atasi's closed-loop voice coil technology. Only a month later the deal was called off, with insiders surmising that neither companies stood to benefit fiscally from merging.

An Atasi 3065/3075 series HDD image from a magazine advertisement.

==== Atasi 3065/3075 ====
In December 1983, the AT-3065 and AT-3075 were announced as an expansion to the 3000 series of 5 1/4-inch hard disk drives. They had 65 and 75 MB of storage with an average access time of 24 ms. The drives were set to be released in mid-1984 with the 3065 costing $1,800 and the 3075 $1,950.

Gibeau left Atasi in early 1984, going on to join Epelocorp, a subsidiary created by Xebec Corporation, as the president. Alan J. Grant would then take over Atasi as temporary president until July.

=== Donald R. Lundell era (1984–1985) ===
Lundell joined Atasi in 1982 as vice president of engineering. Before joining Atasi, he spent over 18 years at IBM in various management positions. In July 1984, he was appointed president and CEO of the company, taking over from Alan J. Grant, who was the interim president since February of that year.

==== Financial struggles/infringement suits ====
By September 1984, Atasi was struggling financially. The company had about $100 million in backlog orders from computer manufactures such as Convergent Technologies and NCR. However, due to the high production cost of their drives and having difficulty raising funding from investors, the company was failing to manufacture orders and make a profit.

In November 1984, Atasi filed a patent infringement suit against Seagate Technology. Lundell claimed that Seagate used information gained from the previous year's failed acquisition deal in designing their new ST4000 5-1/4in hard drive series. He also claimed they illegally used Atasi's dual coil linear actuator design in the ST4000 and disregarded a confidentiality agreement made during the failed acquisition deal.

Additionally Lundell considered filing patent infringement suits against other drive manufacturers such as Tandon and Applied Storage Technology after already filing one against Priam.

In July 1985, Lundell was looking for a firm to buy the company or its hard disk drive technology after laying off most of its employees. Atasi started with 500 employees in the beginning of 1985, dropping to 280 then only 14 after additional layoffs in mid 1985. Lundell cited a concurrent slowdown in the personal computer market as well as freezing of the company's credit line as the reasons for the layoffs.

In August 1985, Atasi filed for Chapter 11 protection.

==== Computer Memories deal ====
In October 1985, Computer Memories, Inc., and Atasi discussed a pact in which Computer Memories would acquire Atasi's closed loop voice coil technology. On October 29, Computer Memories backed out of the deal, for seemingly unknown reasons. It was said the deal would have attracted new customers to Computer Memories by allowing them to expand their product line, after IBM in August did not renew its contract to purchase hard disk drives from them for their PC AT.

Atasi was to receive $1 million with up to an additional $5 million in royalties from the deal. Lundell said he was confused by the decision as Computer Memories was previously eager to sign the agreement. Computer Memories most likely backed out of the deal due to their own financial struggles at the time.

Lundell resigned from Atasi in November 1985, later becoming president of Aspen Peripherals Corporation in February 1986.

=== Stanley F. Brown era (1985–1987) ===
Brown was one of the founders of Atasi and by 1986 had 20 years of hard disk drive industry experience with multiple patents made. He left Atasi in 1984 and joined Computer Memories, Inc. in August 1985 as senior vice president briefly. After the failed Computer Memories acquisition, he chose to come back as CEO in an attempt to revive the company and take it out of Chapter 11 bankruptcy. Another founder of Atasi, Paul L. Farmer, joined him as vice president for quality assurance.

At the time Atasi relied mainly on contracts with french computer manufacturer Groupe Bull, which sold about 1,000 drives a month, for funding. Brown and his team planned to lower company costs and work out deals with new suppliers. Additionally manufacturing was planned to be shifted from San Jose to the far east.

On June 2, 1986, Atasi emerged from Chapter 11 bankruptcy and had reorganization plans approved.

==== Acquisition by Tandon then Western Digital ====
In December 1986, Tandon Corporation, another large manufacturer of hard drives, announced that they were to acquire Atasi in a $5 million deal after the latter had re-emerged from Chapter 11 bankruptcy reorganization earlier. Computer Memories, Inc. was also negotiating in an attempt to acquire Atasi but was outbid.

The main motive for buying Atasi was to expand the capacity of their disk drives, as Tandon drives went up to 50 MB in capacity while Atasi offered up to 170 MB. Atasi at the time had 65 employees and would operate as a wholly owned subsidiary of Tandon. Production was expected to be shifted from San Jose to Tandon's Singapore facility. Additionally the pending patent infringement suit against Seagate Technology from 1984 would be continued. The deal was finalized in April 1987.

The acquisition was short lived, as in late 1987 Tandon sold their hard disk drive unit to Western Digital in a deal for $49 million. With this move, Western Digital acquired Atasi by proxy. This deal included Atasi's patents and manufacturing facilities in San Jose, California. The deal was finalized in March 1988.

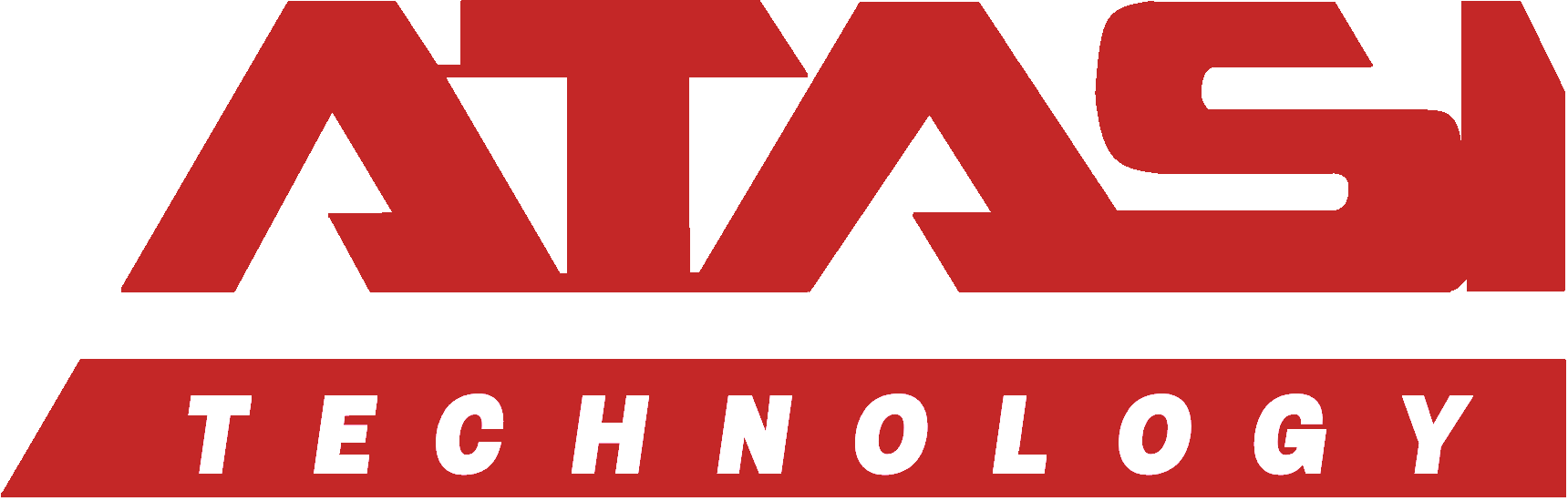
Atasi Technology Logo (1990)

=== Reemergence/David Morris era (1990–1992) ===
In 1990, Atasi re-emerged as a standalone company by the name of Atasi Technology with Davis Morris as the CEO.

In early 1990, Atasi released the MacServer, a 128 MB external drive for Apple computers for $799.

In March 1990, Atasi acquired Priam Corporation's line of 5.25-inch hard drives and inventory for $5.2 million during an asset auction after Priam filed for Chapter 11 bankruptcy. After this, Atasi resold Priam's products using Atasi branding and offered capacities up to 1 GB.

In mid 1990 the lawsuit previously filed against Seagate Technology in November 1984 for patent infringement was dismissed by a U.S. District Court in California. This was due to Western Digital acquiring the patents and having no intent of continuing the suit that had been pending for 6 years.

By April 1992 Atasi Technology was dissolved.

== Trivia ==
In December 1987, an AT-3085 reportedly fell during a flight from the overhead luggage compartment onto the aisle. It was being delivered by a Tandon representative in person to freelance writer Ken Milburn who was building his own 386 based computer. Milburn said nonetheless the drive formatted and worked correctly.

== Products ==
=== Model Table ===
Model no.	Released	Price (Release)	Units Sold (Est.)	Capacity	Size	Interface	Encoding	Spindle RPM
AT-3020	1982	$1,470	?	20 MB	5 1/4" Full	ST-506	MFM	3600 RPM
AT-3033	1982	$1,800	1-5,000 (1984)*	33 MB	5 1/4" Full	ST-506	MFM	3600 RPM
AT-3046	1982	?	12,000+ (1984)*	46 MB	5 1/4" Full	ST-506	MFM	3600 RPM
AT-3051	1984-1985(?)	?	?	51 MB	5 1/4" Full	ST-506	MFM	3600 RPM
AT-3051+	1984-1985(?)	?	?	54 MB	5 1/4" Full	ST-506	MFM	3600 RPM
AT-3053	1984-1985(?)	?	?	53 MB	5 1/4" Full	ST-506	MFM	3600 RPM
AT-3065	1984	$1,800	?	65 MB	5 1/4" Full	ST-506	MFM	3600 RPM
AT-3075	1984	$1,950	?	75 MB	5 1/4" Full	ST-506	MFM	3600 RPM
AT-3085	1986	?	?	85 MB	5 1/4" Full	ST-506	RLL	3600 RPM
AT-3128	1986	?	?	128 MB	5 1/4" Full	ST-506	RLL	3600 RPM
Rebranded Priam Drives
Atasi Gold	1990	$449	?	72 MB	5 1/4" Full	?	MFM	3600 RPM
519	1990	?	?	140 MB	5 1/4" Full	ST-412	MFM	3600 RPM
519R	1990	?	?	244 MB	5 1/4" Full	ST-412	RLL	3600 RPM
638	1990	?	?	382 MB	5 1/4" Full	ESDI-10 MHz	RLL	3600 RPM
676	1990	$1,899	?	765 MB	5 1/4" Full	ESDI-15 MHz	RLL	3600 RPM
738	1990	?	?	338 MB	5 1/4" Full	SCSI	RLL	3600 RPM
776	1990	?	?	676 MB	5 1/4" Full	SCSI	RLL	3600 RPM
6120	1990	$2,995	?	1 GB	5 1/4" Full	ESDI-24 MHz	RLL	3600 RPM
7120	1990	?	?	1 GB	5 1/4" Full	SCSI	RLL	3600 RPM
V130	?	?	?	30 MB	5 1/4" Full	ST-506	?	3600 RPM
V150	?	?	?	50 MB	5 1/4" Full	ST-506	?	3600 RPM
V170	?	?	?	70 MB	5 1/4" Full	ST-506	?	3600 RPM
V185	?	?	?	85 MB	5 1/4" Full	ST-506	?	3600 RPM
Model Table Sources: , Hard Drive Bible VII Edition - Corporate Systems Center (1994) - Archived by bitsavers.org; Hard Drive Specs from PRIAM - stason.org; ? - Unknown/missing data

=== Image Gallery ===
Atasi 3051 Disk Drive

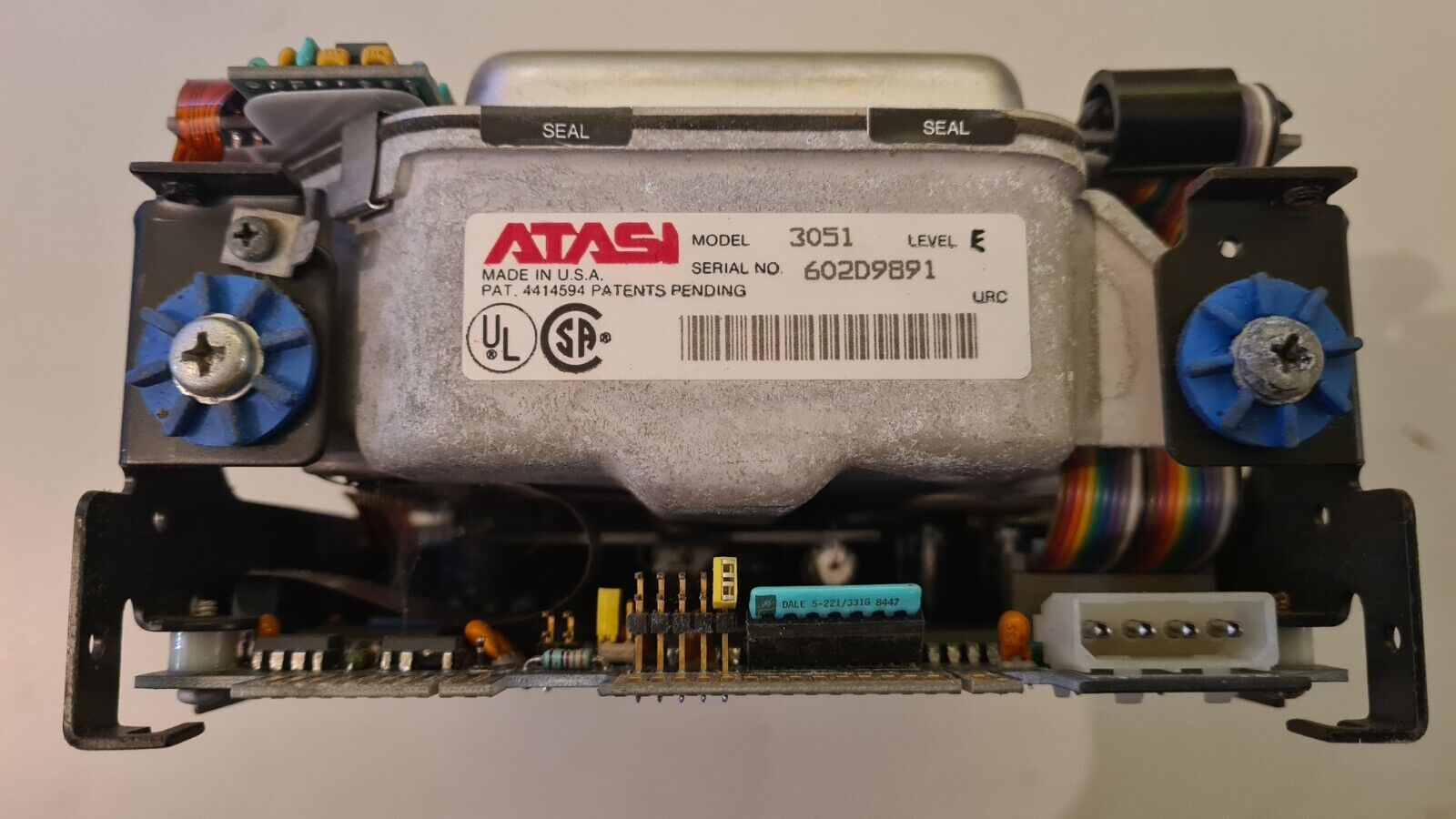
Front view of an Atasi 3051.

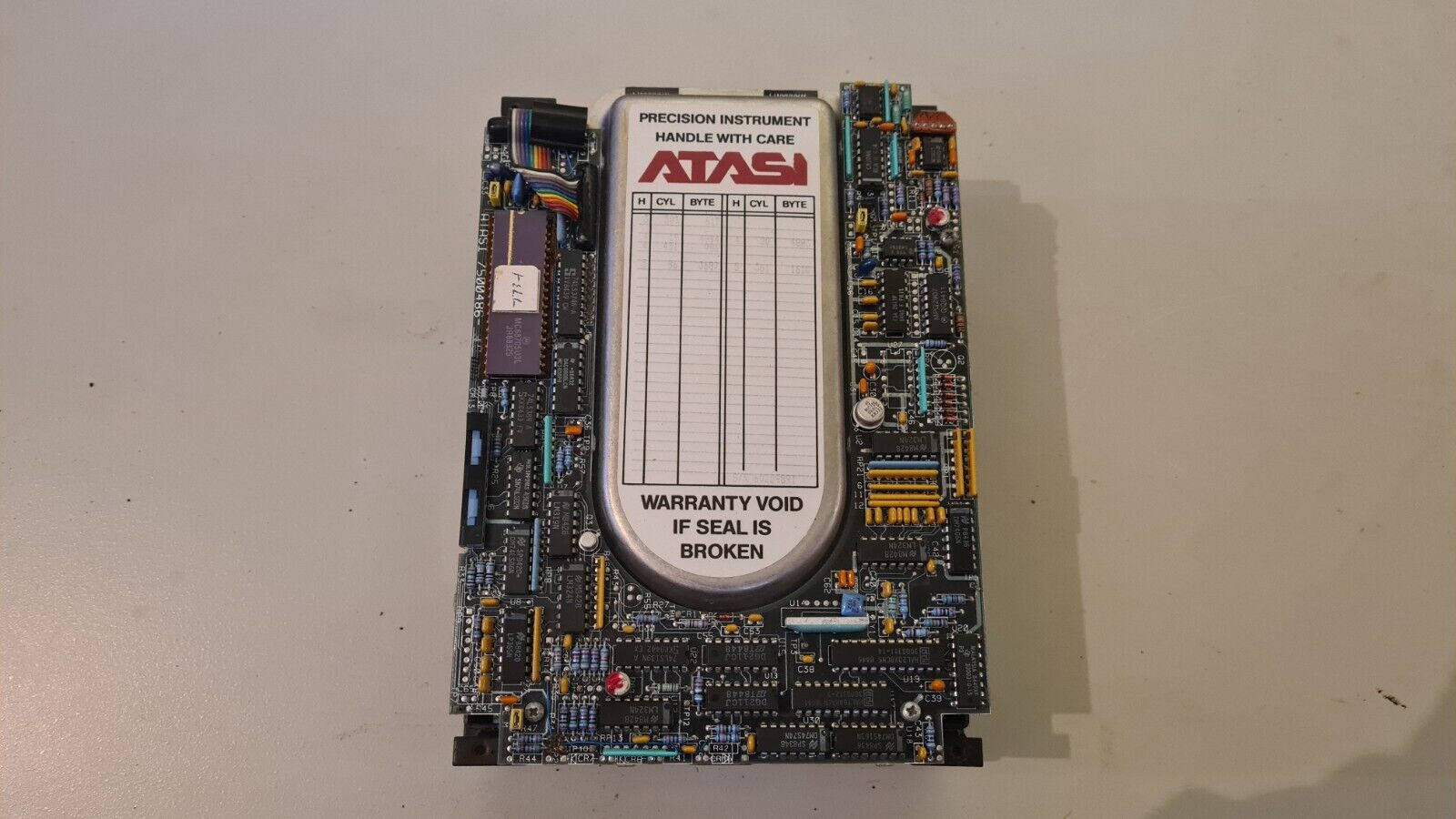
Top view of an Atasi 3051.

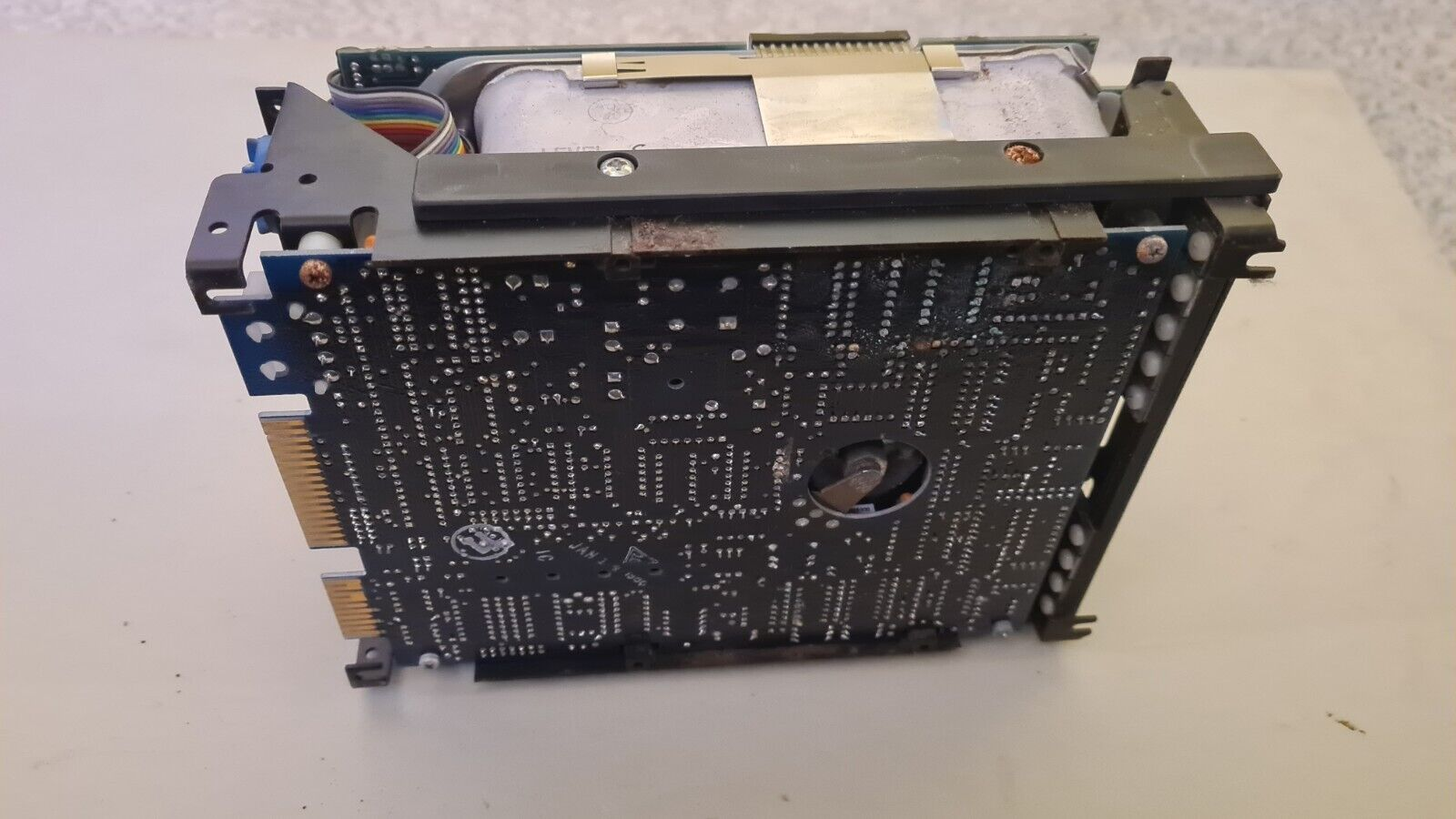
Bottom/side view of an Atasi 3051

== See also ==
- List of defunct hard disk manufacturers
- History of hard disk drives
- Tandon Corporation
- Computer Memories, Inc.
