= John Moon =

John Moon may refer to:

- John A. Moon (1855–1921), U.S. Representative from Tennessee
- John W. Moon (1836–1898), U.S. Representative from Michigan
- John P. Moon (born 1938), Apple Computers executive
- John B. Moon (1849–1915), American lawyer and politician in the Virginia House of Delegates
- John Moyne or Moon, MP for Calne
