= John P. Moon =

American business executive (1938–2020)

John Moon
- Born: John Perry Moon; July 15, 1938; Philadelphia, Pennsylvania, U.S.
- Died: October 15, 2020 (aged 82)
- Occupation: Apple VP
- Years active: 1960–2020

John P. Moon (July 15, 1938 – October 15, 2020) was an American business executive for Apple Inc. He earned engineering degrees from Pennsylvania State University and New York University. From the 1960s to the 1980s, Moon worked for companies including IBM, National Micronetics Corporation, Tandon Magnetics Corporation, and Apple.

== Early life ==
Moon was born in Philadelphia, Pennsylvania on July 15, 1938. His father, Perry Moon was a construction worker who often answered John's questions about how things work. John spent his time building model cars in the family basement where he assembled and took apart electronic devices. Since he worked so well with his hands, he was quick at repairing things like radios, earning him the nickname "fix-it boy", which was given to him by his neighbors.

== Education ==
Moon's best subjects in school were Mathematics, Science and English. After he graduated high school with honors, he enrolled at Pennsylvania State University where he received a degree in mechanical engineering in 1960. After graduating from there he decided to further pursue his education and get his masters from New York University (NYU) where he continued his studies in engineering.

== Careers ==
=== IBM ===
During the 1960s major companies started recruiting African Americans to work with and for them due to the change of the race relations and they were responding to the demands that the Civil Rights Movement put on government and businesses suggesting that there should be equal opportunities for all. Moon was hired at IBM (International Business Machines) in New York City through a program that was hiring African Americans who have experience in the math and science fields; particularly engineers. Though Moon knew very little about computers when he began his career at IBM he thrived throughout the remainder of his time there. He was hired when computer technology was changing rapidly. He joined other IBM scientists in physics, electrical and mechanical engineering and chemistry who were looking at ways to better computers and how they function. He left IBM in 1970.

=== National Micronetics Corporation ===
In 1970, Moon established the National Micronetics Corporation with a few other engineers in a garage. There, they researched ways to use a magnetic substance called ferrite. From there, he and his colleagues found a way to make ferrite recording heads which were in high demand. Within a couple years their business grew from five people working in a garage to a multimillion-dollar company. Four years later, he moved to California where he worked for several different technology companies.

=== Tandon Magnetics Corporation ===
In 1976, he started working with Tandon Magnetics Corporation. The double side disc that could save more data was invented by Jugi Tandon, and Moon contributed to the success of this product by finding a new way to manufacture this new technological advance by making these ferrite recording heads through mass production rather than one at a time. The implication of Moon's mass production brought a lot of money to the company.

=== Apple ===
Moon moved to Apple Computers (Apple Inc.) in 1980. Around this time, Apple Computers were the leading personal computer company. Though they had already been making over $100 million. To further their success Apple hired Moon to help the company design and make its own floppy disks and disk drives of which several were designed himself. Moon became Vice President of the Apple Computer Products division.

=== Personal life and death ===
John also served in the US Army for two years during the Vietnam War, demonstrating bravery and commitment to his fellow soldiers.

Moon died on October 15, 2020, at the age of 82.
