= Dysan =

American storage media manufacturing corporation

Dysan Corporation
- Dysan logo
- Founded: 1973 San Jose, California
- Founder: C. Norm Dion
- Defunct: 1984
- Successor: Xidex Magnetics
- Headquarters: Santa Clara, California

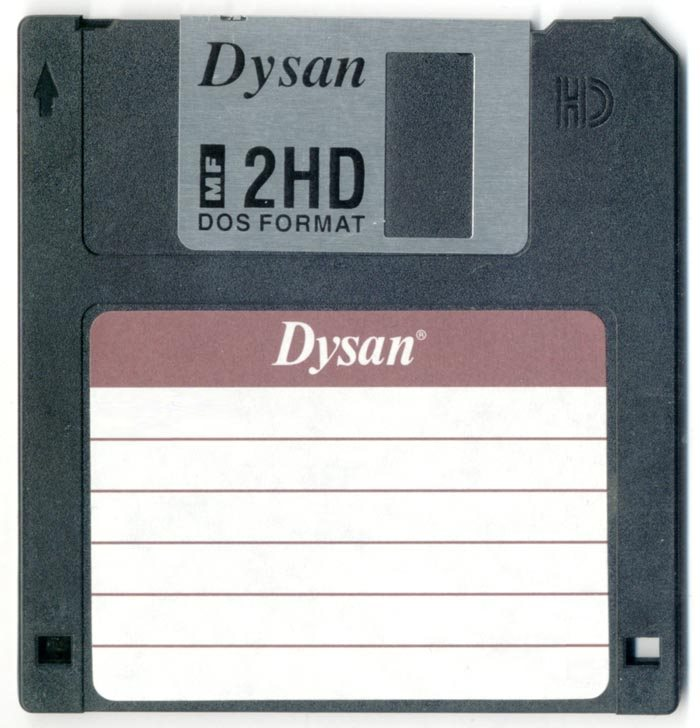
Dysan 3.5" floppy disk

Dysan Corporation was an American storage media manufacturing corporation, formed in 1973 in San Jose, California, by CEO and former president C. Norman Dion. It was instrumental in the development of the 5.25" floppy disk, which appeared in 1976.

== History ==
In 1983, Jerry Pournelle reported in BYTE that a software-publisher friend of his "distributes all his software on Dysan disks. It costs more to begin with, but saves [the cost of replacing defective media] in the long run, or so he says". By that year Dysan was a Fortune 500 company, had over 1200 employees, and was ranked as among the top ten private sector employers within Silicon Valley by the San Jose Mercury News, in terms of number of employees. In addition, some of Dysan's administrative and disk production facilities, located within the company's Santa Clara, manufacturing campus, were regarded as architecturally remarkable. For example, some of Dysan's Santa Clara campus magnetic media manufacturing facilities included architectural features such as large indoor employee lounge atriums, incorporating glass encased ceilings and walls, live indoor lush landscaping, waterfalls, running water creeks, and ponds with live fish.

In addition to manufacturing floppies, tape drives and hard disk drives, Dysan also produced hardware and storage containers for the disks.

Dysan merged with Xidex Magnetics in the spring of 1984. In 1997, under the direction of Jerry Ticerelli, Xidex declared bankruptcy. Xidex was absorbed by Anacomp and later spun off as a wholly owned subsidiary as Dysan.

After a brief re-opening in 2003, the company closed six months later under the direction of Dylan Campbell.

== Recycling service ==
It is possible that Dysan was one of the first tech-based companies to offer a service for recycling used products. Some Dysan packaging included the following label:

Flexible media should be disposed of in an environmentally sound manner.
Consumers may send used diskettes (regardless of brand) to:
Dysan Enviro-Center
P.O. Box 361510
Milpitas, CA 95036-1510

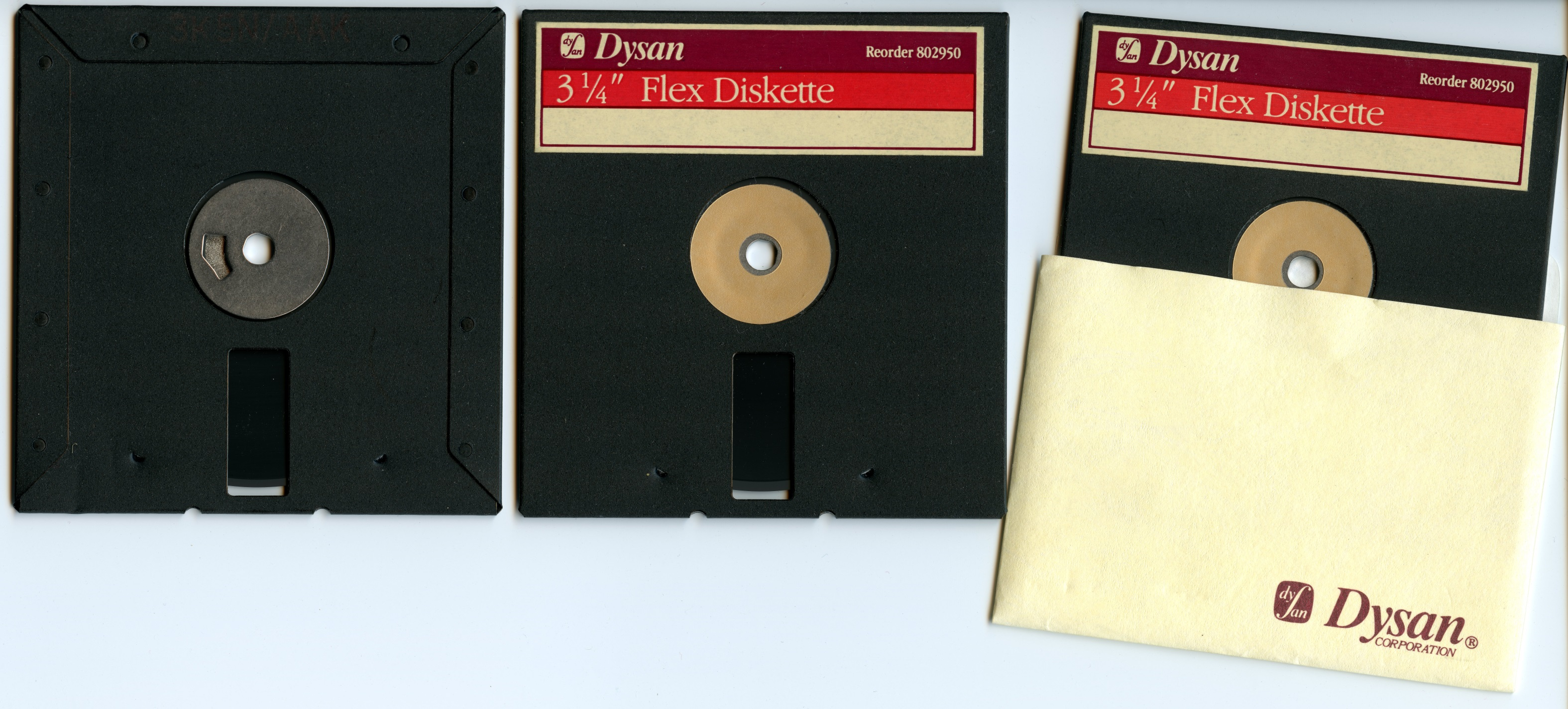
Dysan 3-1/4" floppy disk used in Tabor Drivette drives

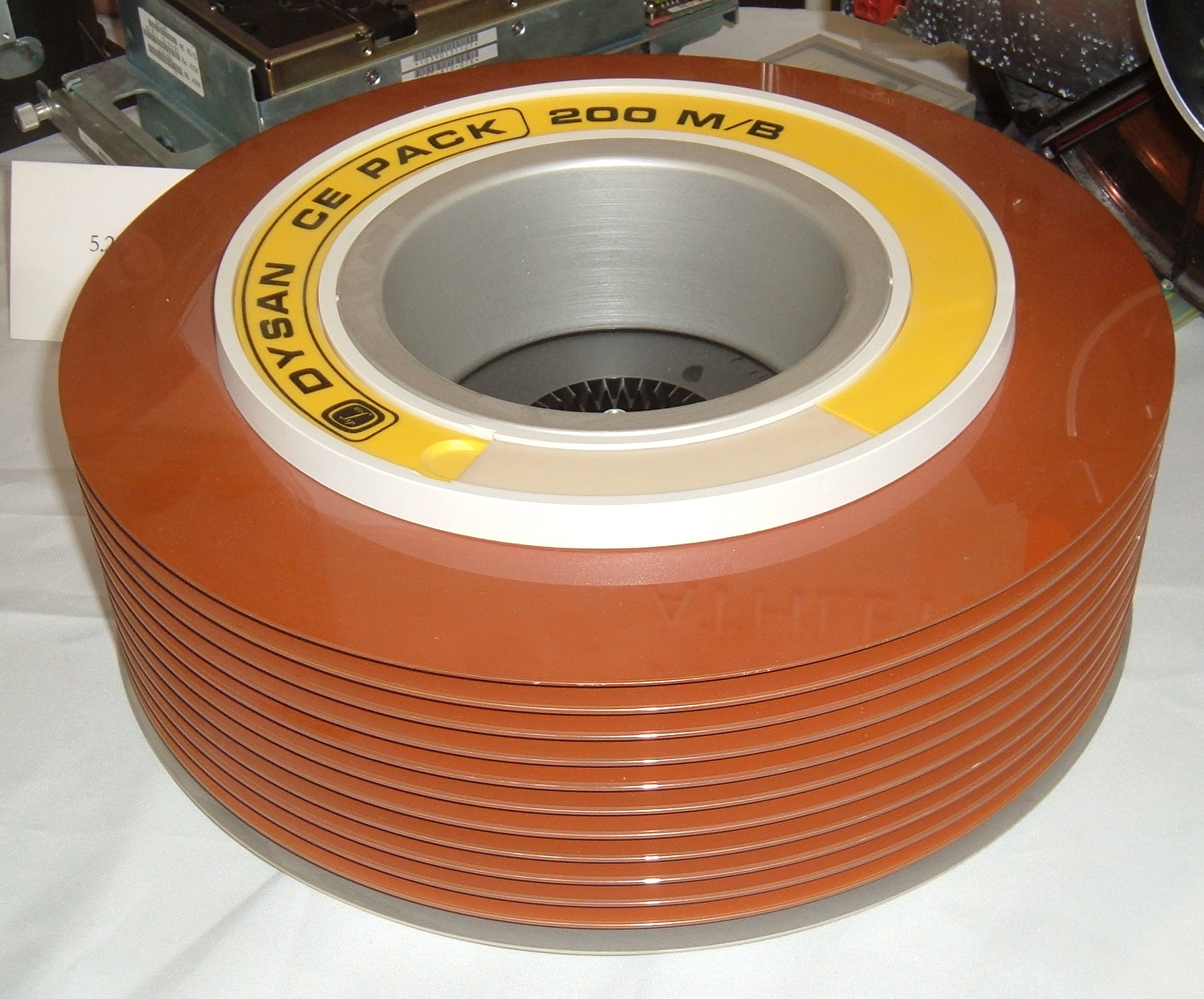
Dysan 200 megabyte disk pack, with the cover removed
