= JT Storage =

Defunct Hard drive manufacturer

JTS Corporation
- Company type: Private
- Industry: Electronics
- Predecessor: Kalok Corporation
- Founded: February 3, 1994; 31 years ago
- Founders: Sirjang Lal Tandon; David Pearce
- Defunct: January 28, 1999; 26 years ago
- Fate: Bankruptcy; Liquidated
- Headquarters: San Jose, California, United States
- Area served: Worldwide
- Key people: David "Tom" Mitchell (CEO, 1995–1999); Jack Tramiel (Director, 1996–1998)
- Products: Hard Drives
- Brands: Atari (brand)

JT Storage, Inc. (also known as JTS Corporation) was a maker of inexpensive IDE hard drives for personal computers based in San Jose, California. It was founded in 1994 by "Jugi" Tandon—the inventor of the double-sided floppy disk drive and founder of Tandon Corporation—and David B. Pearce, of former bankrupt disk manufacturer Kalok. Its name is derived from its co-founder, standing for Jugi Tandon Storage.

The company reverse-merged with Jack Tramiel's Atari Corporation in 1996, sold all Atari assets to Hasbro Interactive in 1998 and was declared bankrupt in 1999.

== History ==
It was founded under the legal name JT Storage, Inc., but traded as JTS Corp. A few months after its foundation, Pearce departed the company, with Tandon filling his role as president. Then in June 1995, Tom Mitchell, a co-founder of Seagate and former president and Chief Operating Officer of both Seagate and Conner Peripherals, was appointed the Chief Executive Officer of JTS.

=== First products ===
JTS initially focused on a new 3" form-factor drive for laptops. The 3" form factor allowed a larger drive capacity for laptops with the existing technology. Compaq was actively engaged in qualifying these drives and built several laptops with this form factor drive. Lack of a second source was a major obstacle for this new form factor to gain a foothold; JTS licensed the form factor to Western Digital to attempt to remedy this problem. Eventually, as 2.5" drives became cheaper to build, interest in the 3" form factor waned, and JTS and WD stopped the project in 1998.

JTS by then had become a source of cheap, medium-performance 3.5" drives with 5400 RPM spindles. The drives, produced in a factory in India (the factory was in the Madras Export Processing Zone in the suburbs of the Southern Indian city of Madras, now known as Chennai), were known for poor reliability. Failure rates were very high and quality control was inconsistent: good drives were very good, still running after 5 years, whereas bad drives almost always failed within a few weeks. Because of their low-tier reputation, JTS drives were rare in brand-name PCs and most frequently turned up in home-built and whitebox PCs. Product lines included Palladium and Champion internal IDE hard drives.

The basic design of their drives was done by Kalok for TEAC in the early 1990s. TEAC used the design as part of a removable HDD system, which was also sold under the Kalok name. After Kalok failed in 1994, JTS hired its founder as their chief technical officer, and licensed the patents involved from TEAC and Pont Peripherals.

=== Merger with Atari Corporation ===
On February 13, 1996, JTS announced a reverse merger with former video game and home computer manufacturer, Atari Corporation. It was primarily a marriage of convenience; JTS had products but little cashflow, while Atari had money, primarily from a series of successful lawsuits earlier in the decade followed by good investments. However, with the failure of its Jaguar game console, losses mounting, and no other products to sell, Atari expected to run out of money within two years. Originally it was planned that the storage company and Atari would be two separate divisions under JTS, but in April the merger was amended so that Atari would merge into JTS, with JTS being the surviving entity. Atari's Jack Tramiel would take a place on JTS's board of directors.

Within a few months of the merger becoming official on July 30, all former Atari employees were either dismissed or relocated to JTS's headquarters. Atari's remaining inventory of Jaguar products proved difficult to get rid of, even at liquidation prices, and the bulk of them remained in stock months after the merger. It was finally moved out to a private liquidator on December 23, 1996. Next Generation Online reported that no video game software was developed by JTS during this time, although licensing to third-parties did result in a handful of releases: THQ's Super Breakout / Battlezone on Game Boy, Midway's Arcade's Greatest Hits: The Atari Collection 1, Activision's Battlezone on PC, and a number of Jaguar games by Telegames.

=== Demise ===
The company secured $25 million in finances in September 1997. But even with the cash infusion from Atari and the investments, JTS quickly ran out of money. On March 13, 1998, JTS sold the Atari name and assets to Hasbro Interactive for $5 million, less than one-sixtieth what Hasbro had paid for Tiger Electronics earlier that same year. On two occasions in April, JTS staff were laid off including some former long-time Atari individuals, and the company was soon forced out of AMEX. Later that year, on December 11, JTS filed for Chapter 11 bankruptcy protection, with a reported $4.2 million assets and $136 million of liabilities. However, on January 28, 1999, the company was closed down for good when its filing was ultimately converted into involuntary Chapter 7 liquidation by the bankruptcy courts. Its president and CEO, Tom Mitchell, returned to the disk storage industry the following year when he founded Fabrinet.
