= Disk pack =

Obsolete form of removable media

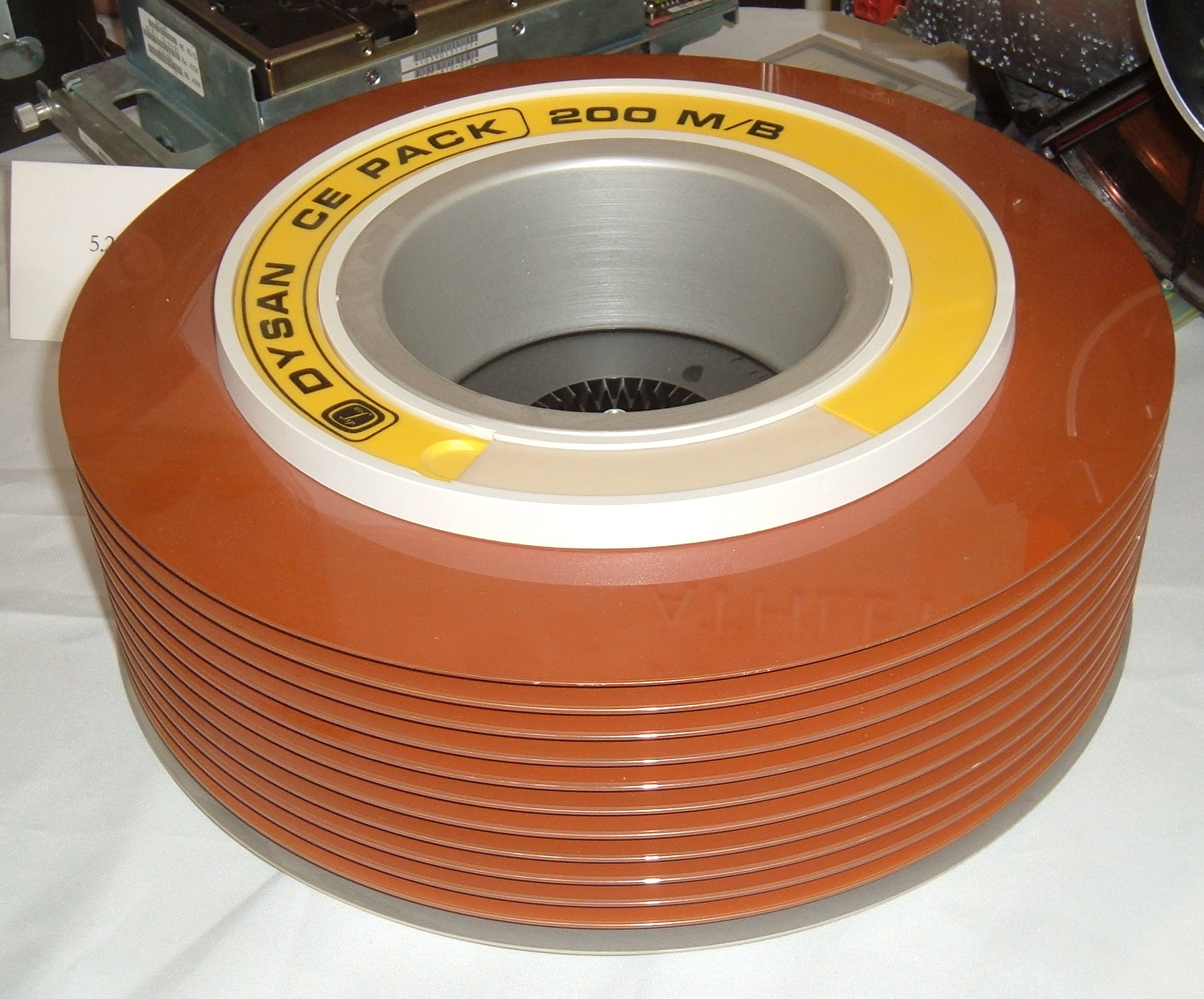
1970s vintage 200 megabyte disk pack manufactured by Dysan, with the cover removed

Disk packs and disk cartridges were early forms of removable media for computer data storage, introduced in the 1960s.

== Disk pack ==
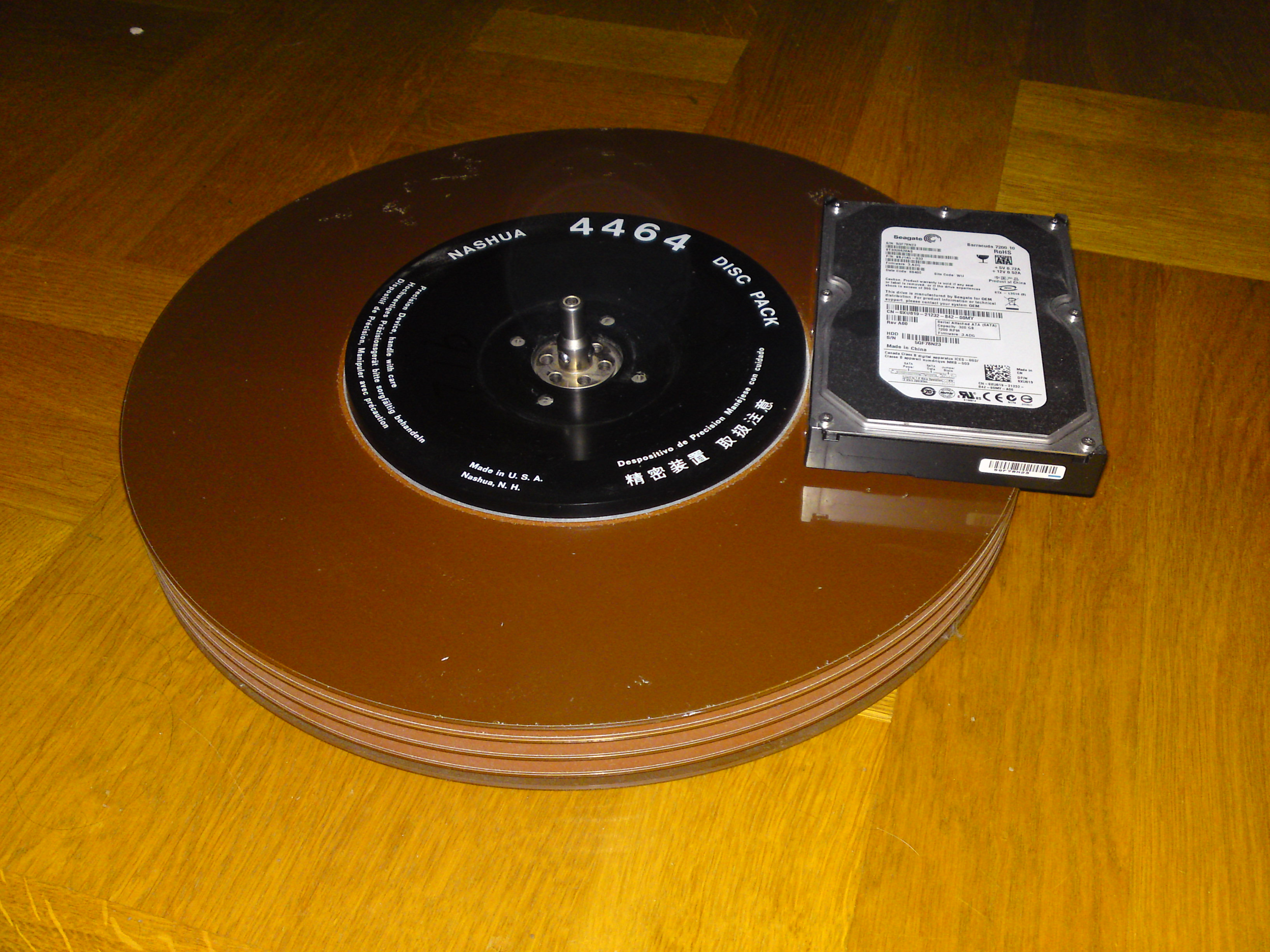
Disk pack manufactured by Nashua, USA, without its protective cover. A 3.5" modern hard drive is shown for comparison.

A disk pack is a layered grouping of hard disk platters (circular, rigid discs coated with a magnetic data storage surface). A disk pack is the core component of a hard disk drive. In modern hard disks, the disk pack is permanently sealed inside the drive. In many early hard disks, the disk pack was a removable unit, and would be supplied with a protective canister featuring a lifting handle.

The protective cover consisted of two parts, a plastic shell that enclosed the top and sides of the disks and a separate bottom that completed the sealed package. A handle would be integral to the top lid design to facilitate disk pack removal and handling. To remove the disk pack, the drive would be taken off line and allowed to spin down. Its access door could then be opened and an empty shell inserted and twisted to unlock the disk platter from the drive and secure it to the shell. The assembly would then be lifted out and the bottom cover attached. A different disk pack could then be inserted by removing the bottom and placing the disk pack with its shell into the drive. Turning the handle would lock the disk pack in place and free the shell for removal.

The first removable disk pack was invented in 1961 by IBM engineers R. E. Pattison as part of the LCF (Low Cost File) project headed by Jack Harker. The 14-inch (356 mm) diameter disks introduced by IBM became a de facto standard, with many vendors producing disk drives using 14-inch disks in disk packs and cartridges into the 1980s.

Examples of disk drives that employed removable disk packs include the IBM 1311, IBM 2311, and the Digital RP04.

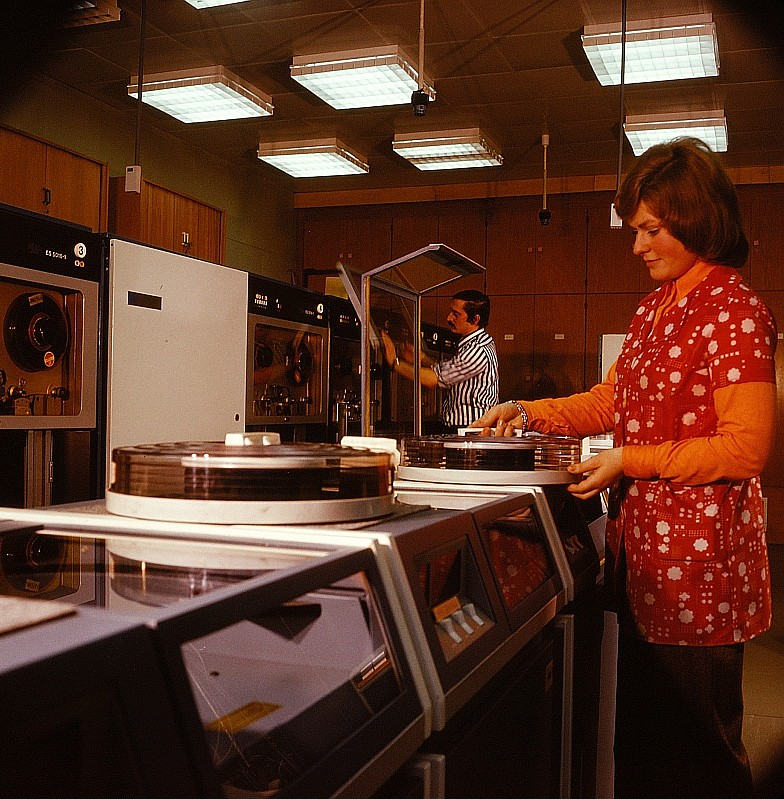
Operator selects a disk pack

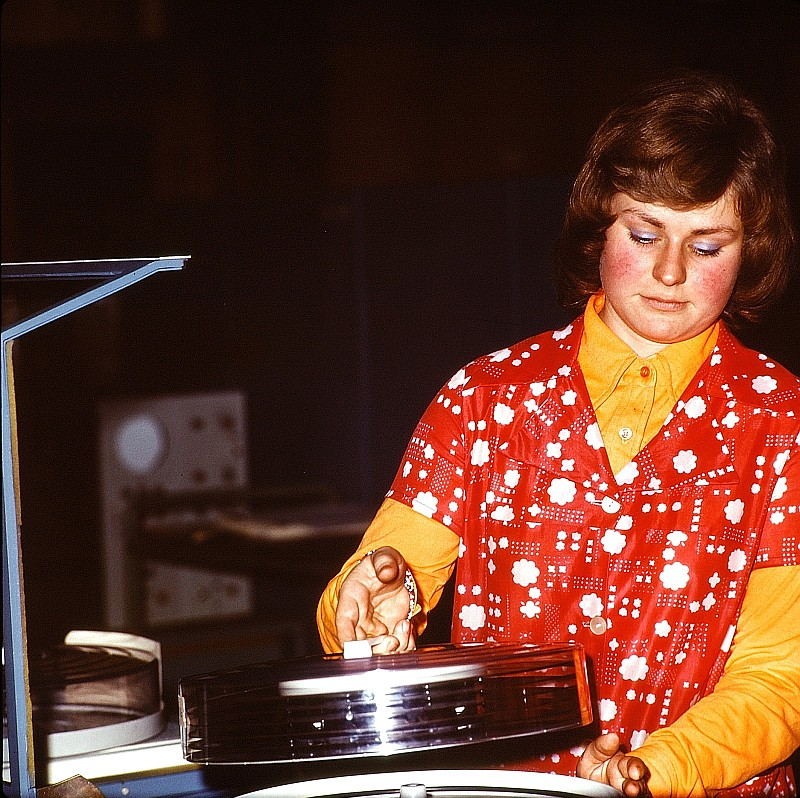
Bottom cover is removed

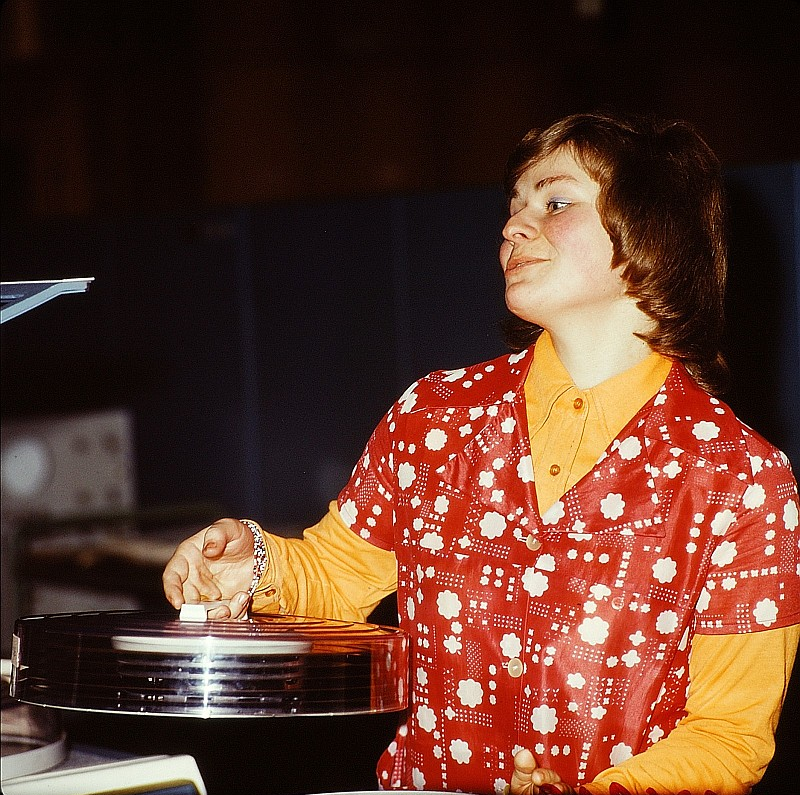
Disk pack is ready for insertion

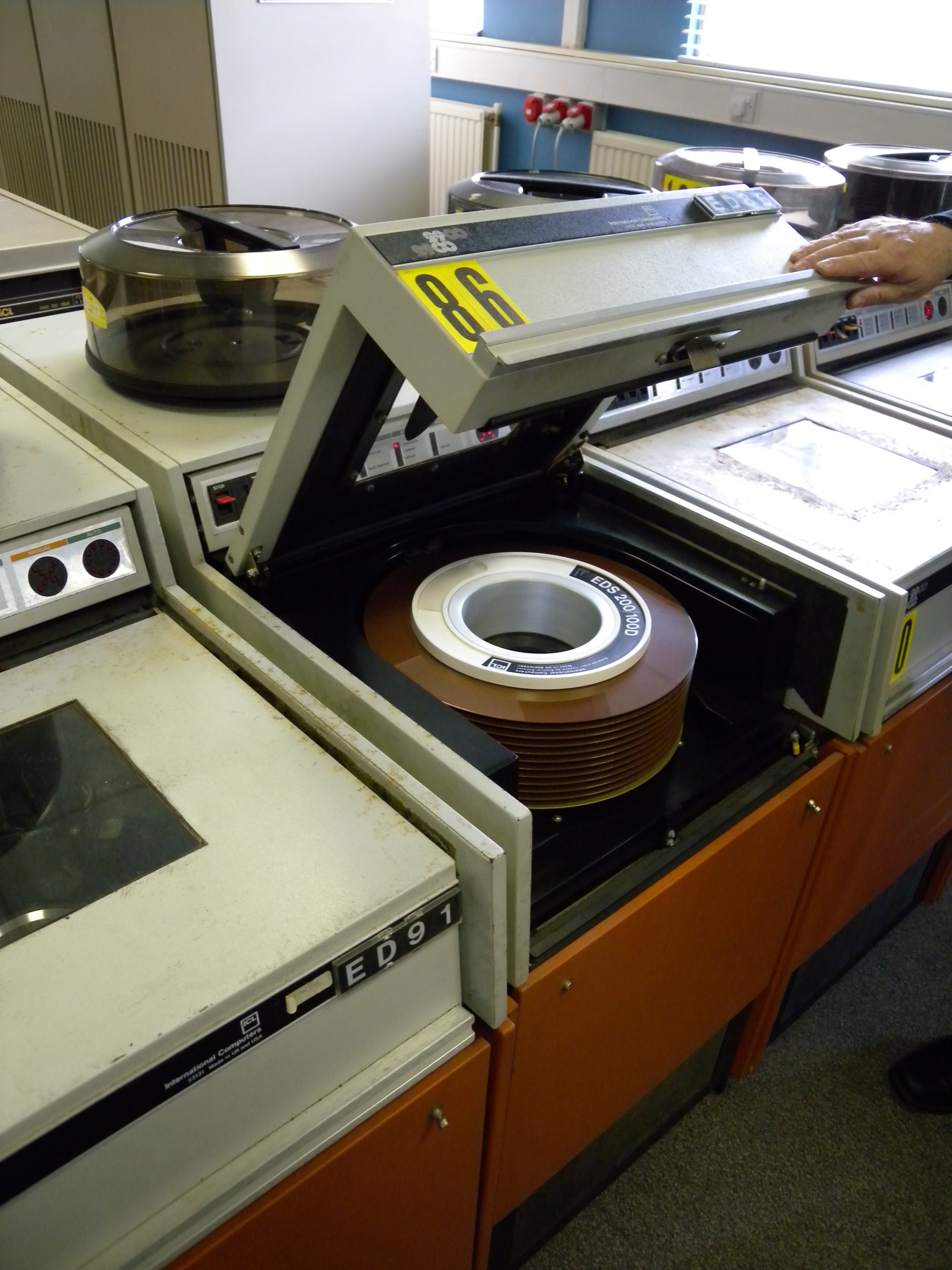
The removable pack is in place

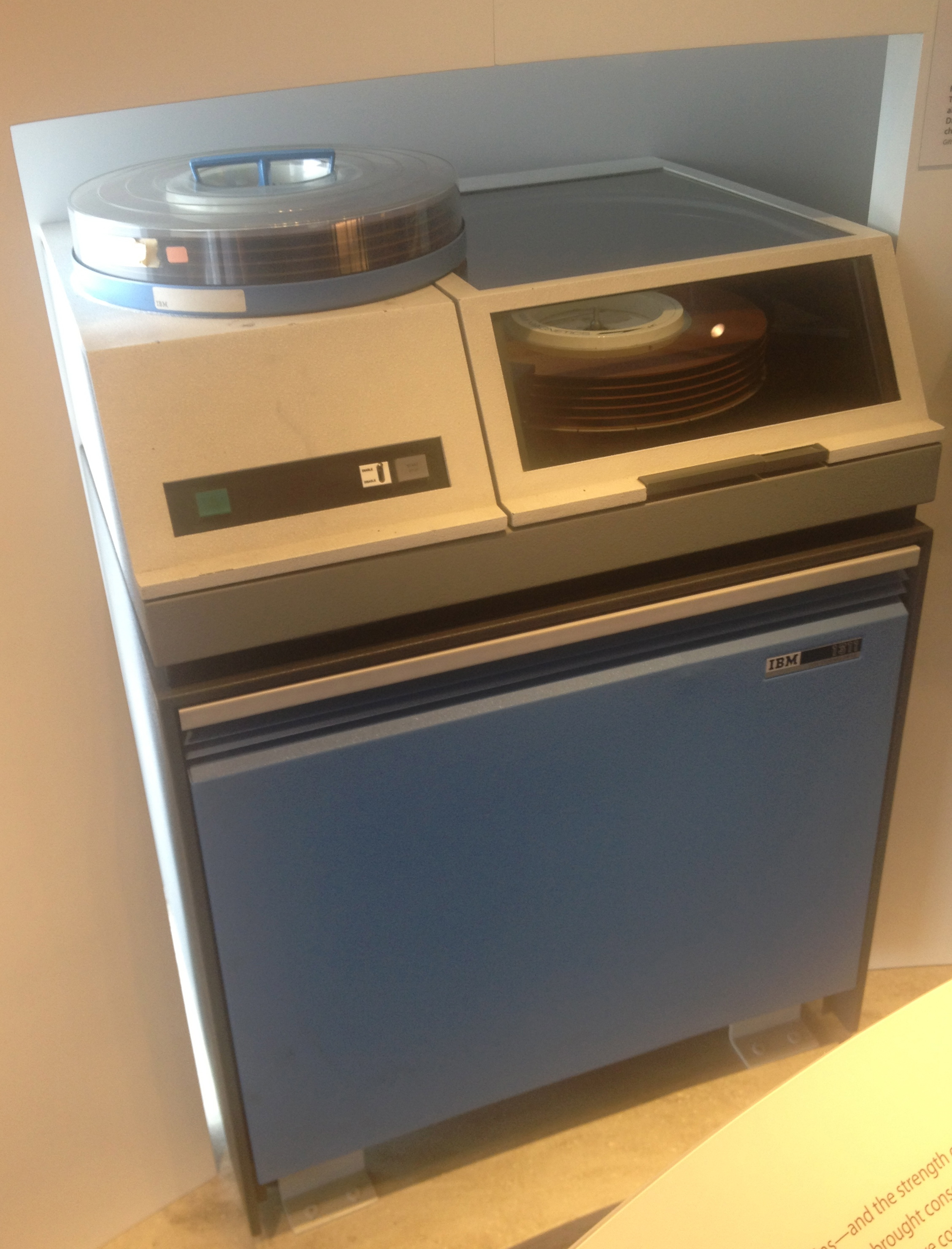
IBM 1311 disk drive with an extra IBM 1316 disk pack

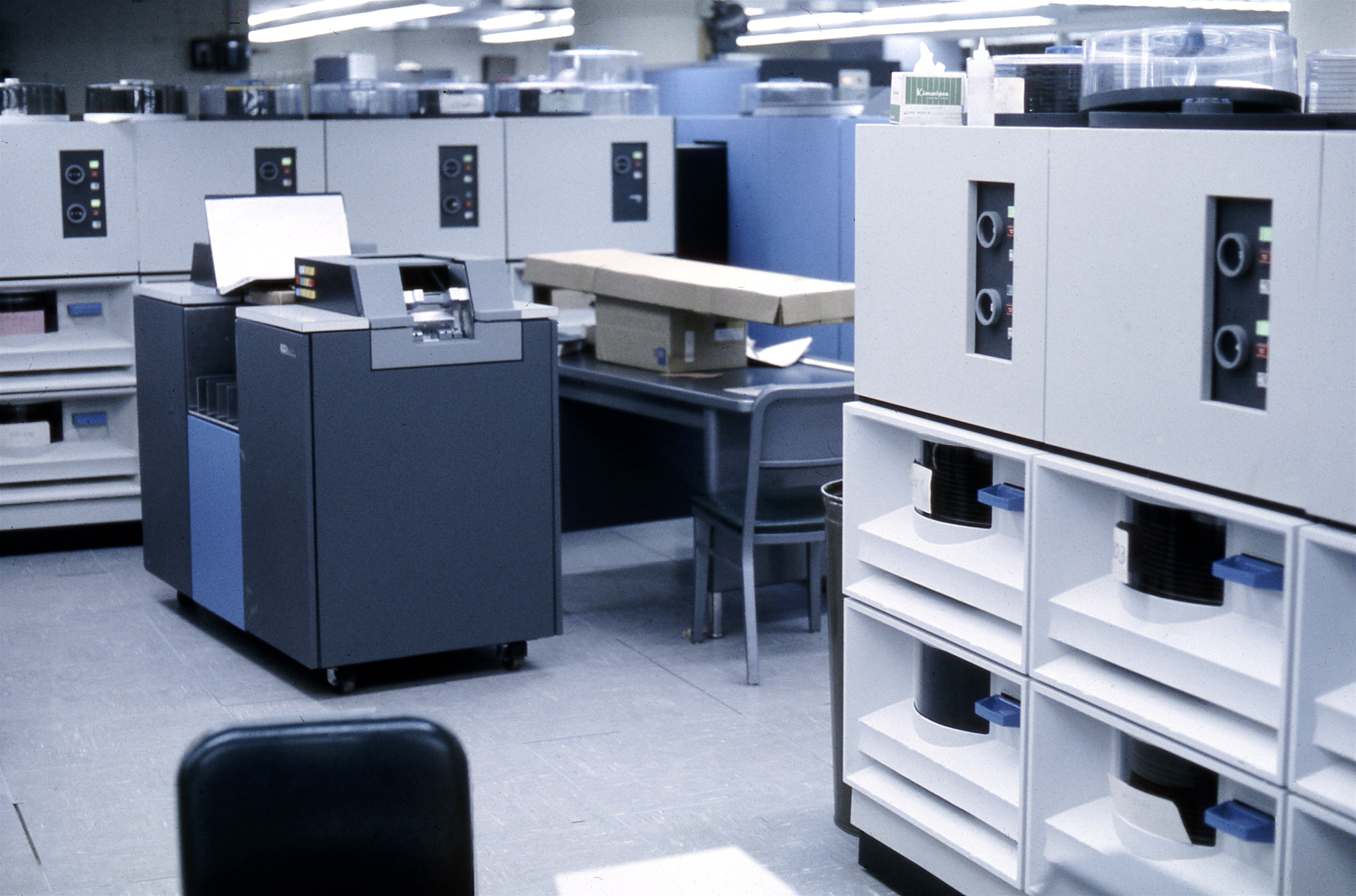
IBM 2314s with removable disk packs and empty covers on top

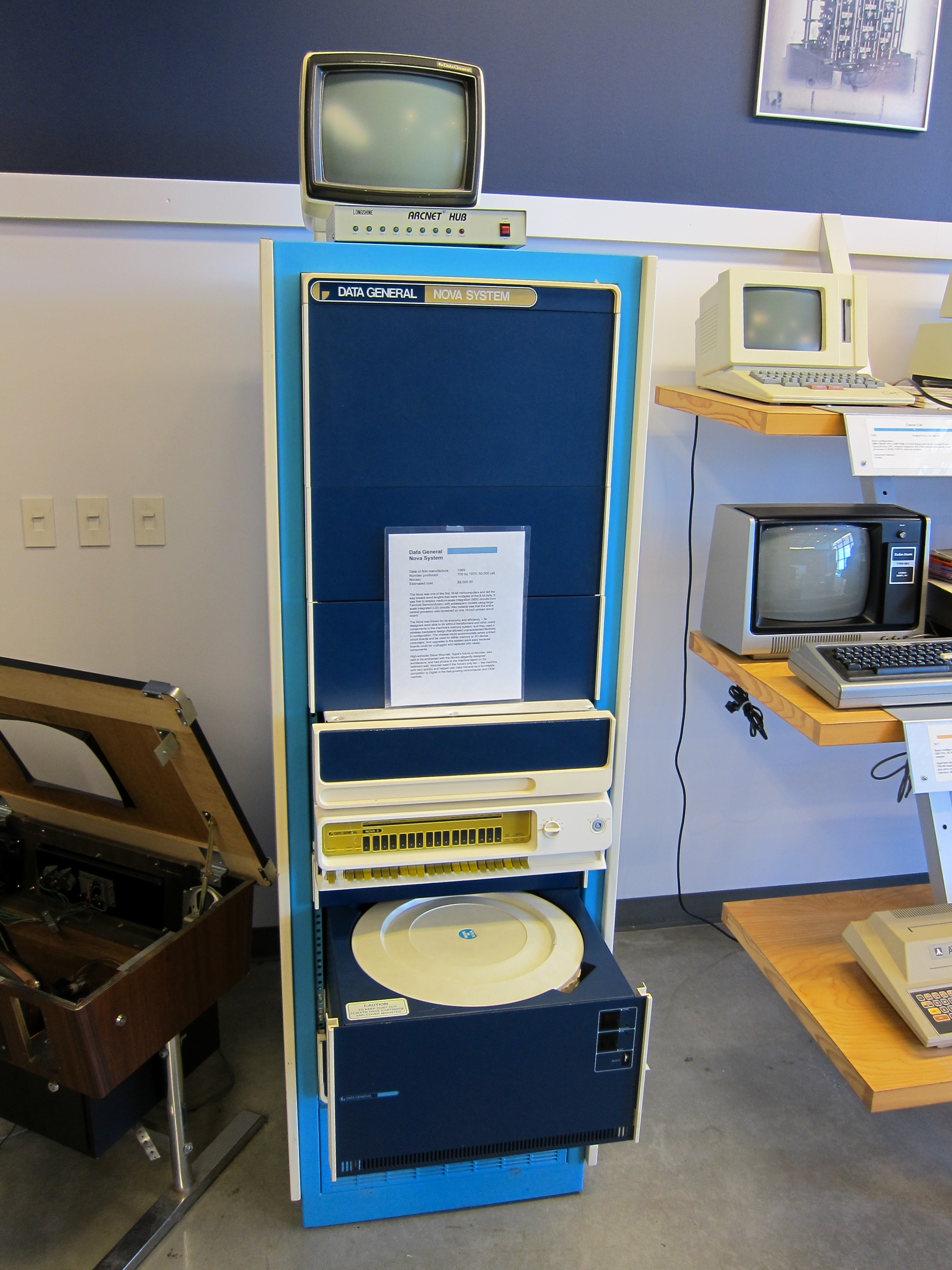
Data General Nova computer with removable disk cartridge

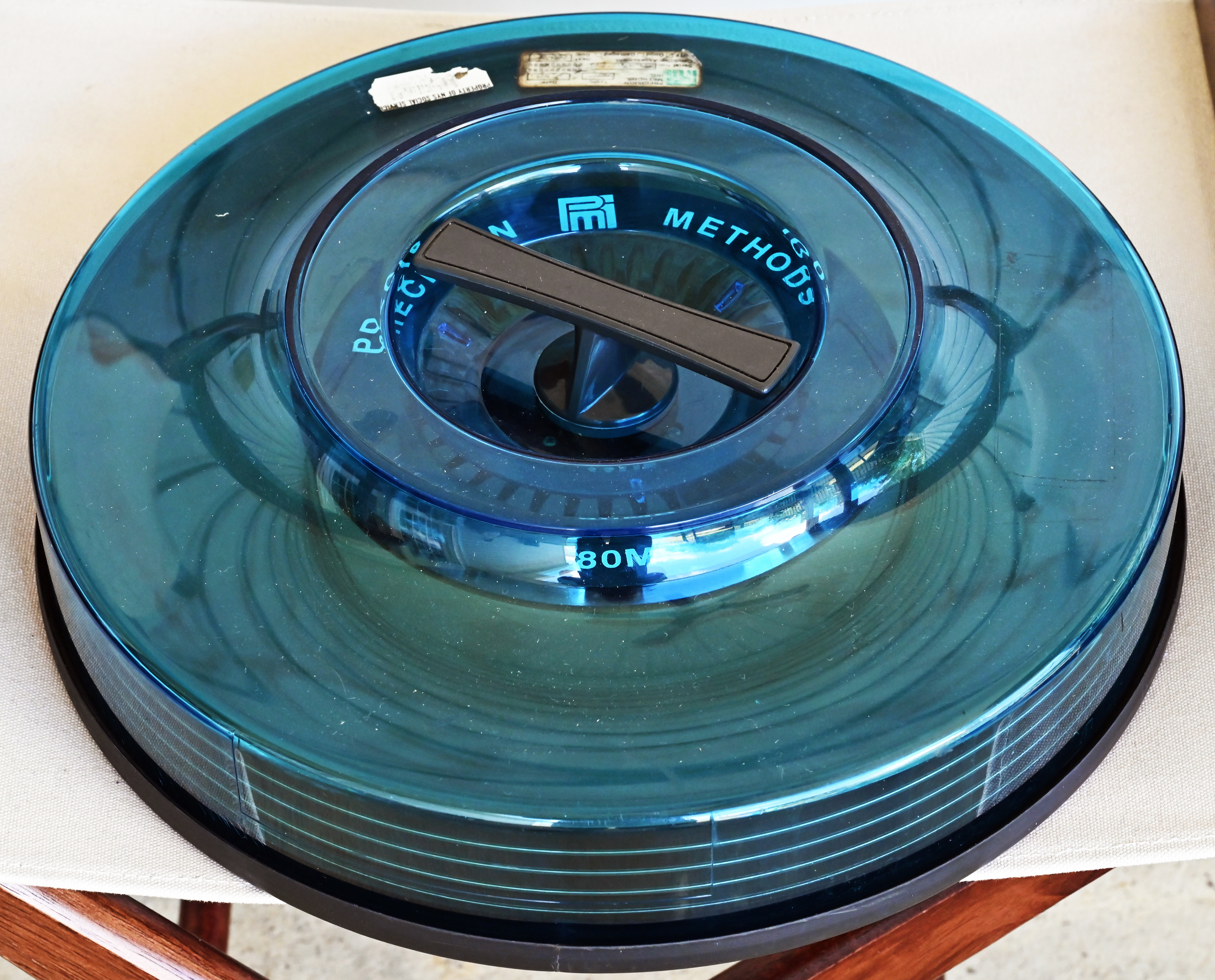
80MB disk pack in its case

== Disk cartridge ==
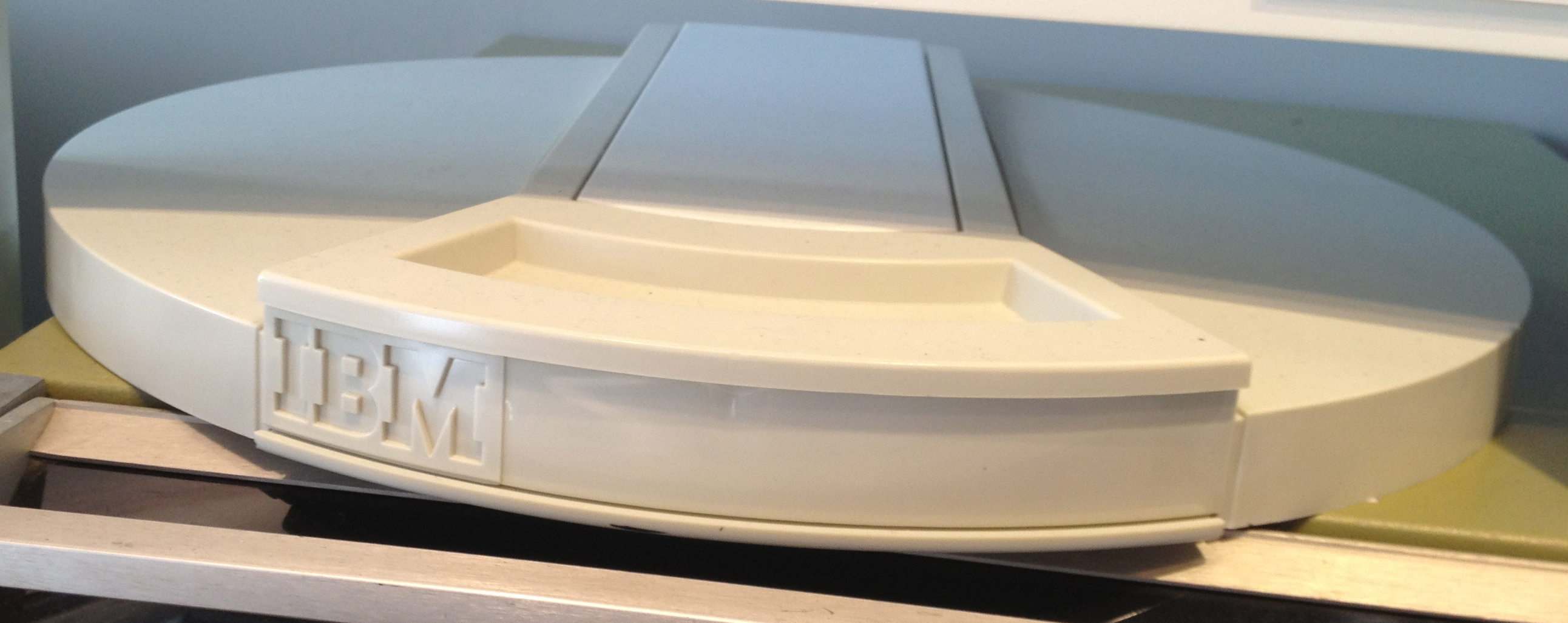
The IBM 2315 disk cartridge stored 1 megabyte of data.

An early disk cartridge was a single hard disk platter encased in a protective plastic shell. When the removable cartridge was inserted into the cartridge drive peripheral device, the read/write heads of the drive could access the magnetic data storage surface of the platter through holes in the shell. The disk cartridge was a direct evolution from the disk pack drive, or the early hard drive. As the storage density improved, even a single platter would provide a useful amount of data storage space, with the benefit being easier to handle than a removable disk pack. An example of a cartridge drive is the IBM 2310, used on the IBM 1130. Disk cartridges were made obsolete by floppy disks.

== Alignment ==
Disk drives with exchangeable disk packs or disk cartridges generally required the data heads to be aligned to allow packs formatted on one drive to be read and written on another compatible drive. Alignment required a special alignment pack, an oscilloscope, an alignment tool that moved the read/write heads, and patience. The pattern generated on the scope looks like a row of alternating C and E characters on their backs. Head alignment needed to be performed after head replacement, and in any case on a periodic basis as part of the routine maintenance required by the drives.

The alignment pack was usually called the "CE pack," because IBM never called their 'service technicians' 'repairmen,' but "Customer Engineers" (CEs). And, since the alignment pack was only to be used by CEs, it was called the "CE Pack." Special CE media was also available for tape drives and diskette drives, known as "the CE tape" and "the CE floppy."

Later drives with exchangeable packs (such as the CDC 8" Lark drives) embedded the servo with the data and didn't require regular head alignment.

== See also ==
- History of hard disk drives
- Caelus Memories
