= Kalok =

Defunct American data storage company

Kalok Corporation
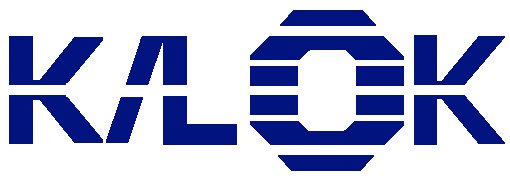
- Company type: Private
- Founded: February 1987; 38 years ago in Sunnyvale, California, United States
- Founder: Steven Kaczeus; Wayne Lockhart
- Defunct: 1994
- Fate: Acquired by JT Storage
- Products: Hard disk drives

Kalok Corporation was an American hard disk drive manufacturer company that was headquartered in Sunnyvale, California. It designed and manufactured low-cost 3.5-in hard disk drives for desktop computers, touching off a number of price wars in the industry, before going bankrupt in 1994.

Kalok's products were not very well known for their reliability or speed, and still used stepper motor head actuator technology in 1991, which was considered outdated as the hard drive industry moved to voice coil head actuators.

== History ==
Kalok Corporation was founded in Sunnyvale, California, in February 1987 by Steven Kaczeus and Wayne Lockhart. The company's founders had extensive prior experience in the field of computer data storage, which helped them attract investment. Kaczeus, the executive vice president of engineering and chief designer of the company's drives, had a history of designing successful products for prominent manufacturers such as LaPine Technology, Memorex, Seagate, and StorageTek. Lockhart, meanwhile, brought over 20 years of management experience from various Silicon Valley companies, including Varian Associates, Spectra-Physics, and Cooper LaserSonics. The company's name is derived from the beginning syllables of the founders' last names (Ka from Kaczeus and Lok from Lockhart). The company was founded with only US$1.5 million in venture capital but immediately made a name for itself in the hard disk drive industry due to its ability to undercut the competition in the 3.5-inch HDD market by several hundreds of dollars. Instrumental to Kalok's early competitive streak was their knack for value engineering, the company eschewing a number of parts used in HDDs its contemporary in order to cut costs. Manufacturing of Kalok's drives was originally performed by the Oriental Precision Company of Seoul, South Korea, who had a minority interest in Kalok as well as a licensing agreement allowing Oriental Precision to resell Kalok's drives under their own name.

In August 1988, Kalok announced the KL341 and KL343, both 40-MB hard disk drives, along with the KL332, a 30-MB HDD. All three were 3.5-inch-diameter HDDs, cost under $330 each, and were for intended for the value-added reseller and OEM markets. The KL341 and KL343's MTBF were rated at 43,000 hours, more than double that of similar 3.5-inch HDDs by Seagate Technology, then the industry leader for such drives. The company announced 100-, 170-, and 330-MB drives for workstations that they hoped would be released in the fourth quarter of 1989.

Monthly output at Oriental Precision went from 1,000 units in December 1987 to 10,000 units per month in October 1988. In late 1989, Kalok began winding down their relationship with Oriental Precision as they focused on raising their own factory in the Philippines in late 1989. The company were helped along with a business relationship with the Ayala Corporation, a large conglomerate in the Philippines. Kalok's move to the Philippines coincided with an unsuccessful coup d'état against the government of Philippine President Corazon Aquino in December 1989. The attempted coup forced Kalok's factory to shut down temporarily; although Lockhart was trapped a hotel in Manila during this time, he jokingly remarked at the time that this event was less disruptive than a four-week factory stoppage at Oriental Precision.

By October 1990, Kalok secured US$15 million in equity financing from investors led by the giant Japanese conglomerate Mitsubishi, which itself acquired a 19-percent ownership stake in Kalok and provided an additional US$8 million line of credit. Other participating investors included Orix Group, a leading leasing firm in Japan, as well as two Japanese venture capital firms: Techno-Venture Co. and Tokyo Venture Capital. Sunwestern Investment Group of Dallas, Texas, was erstwhile the sole U.S.-based investor in Kalok.

Kalok's HDD sales peaked at US$80 million in 1990. The company went into precipitous decline in the early 1990s, with sales falling to $42,000 in 1992, from $60 million in 1991, largely due to Oriental Precision entering court receivership in South Korea and halting production of Kalok's HDDs. The company also encountered critical bugs with their ASICs used on the controller boards of their HDDs, which led to slowed production and costly recalls. As a consequence, Kalok soon found itself in the red by over $28 million. Lockhart resigned as CEO in November 1992, replaced by Robert Martel. In order to stave off its debt, Martel sold their Octagon brand of 40-, 80-, and 120-MB drives to the Xebec Japan Co. and divested its factory in the Philippines back to Ayala. Two foreign companies—DZU AD of Bulgaria and TEAC Corporation of Japan—together invested US$8 million to help revive Kalok. Martel later resigned in June 1993, with David B. Pearce replacing him within this position.

In 1994 Kalok went bankrupt and Pearce moved on to found JT Storage Inc, another hard disk drive manufacturer with Sirjang Lal Tandon and Tom Mitchel. JT Storage would continue engineering and development programs from the defunct Kalok Corporation.

== Hard drive models ==
=== KL-230 ===
Model no.	Gen.	Released	Capacity	Cache	Speed	Interface	Feature set	Sector Size	Notes	Product Page
KL-230	1	2003	20 MB		3600 RPM	MFM, ST412	–	512 bytes	–	Specifications
KL-320			21 MB			MFM, ST506		512 bytes		
KL-330			33 MB		3600 RPM	RLL, ST506		512 bytes		
KL-332		1989	30 MB			ESDI		512 bytes		
KL-340			43 MB			MFM, ST506		512 bytes		
KL-341		1989	40 MB	8 KB	3600 RPM	SCSI-1		512 bytes		
KL-342			43 MB			RLL, ST506		512 bytes		
KL-343		1989	40 MB			RLL, ST506		512 bytes		
KL-360			66 MB			RLL, ST506		512 bytes		
KL-381			85 MB			SCSI-1		512 bytes		
KL-383			85 MB			RLL, ST506		512 bytes		
KL-3100		1991	105 MB	32 KB	3662 RPM	Parallel ATA		512 bytes		
KL-3120			121 MB			Parallel ATA		512 bytes		
P5-125A			126 MB			Parallel ATA		512 bytes		
P5-125S			126 MB			SCSI-2		512 bytes		
P5-250A			252 MB			Parallel ATA		512 bytes		
P5-250S			252 MB			SCSI-2		512 bytes		
K-Stor 250			250 MB			Parallel ATA		512 bytes		
K-Stor 360			360 MB			Parallel ATA		512 bytes		
K-Stor 540			540 MB			Parallel ATA		512 bytes		

== Services ==
One of their last offerings was a 100 megabyte 3.5-inch disk drive using a stepper motor head actuator (rather than the servo-based voice coil operated actuators used on most drives of that density) and was very limited in both access speed and reliability. The drive was manufactured in India, and was commonly found in very inexpensive generic PCs.

In the early 1990s, Kalok also designed hard disks for TEAC who used them as part of a removable hard disk drive system, which was also sold under the Kalok name. After Kalok failed in 1994, JT Storage (JTS) hired its founder as their chief technical officer, and licensed the patents involved from TEAC and Pont Peripherals.
