= Caelus Memories =

Defunct American data storage company

Caelus Memories, Inc.
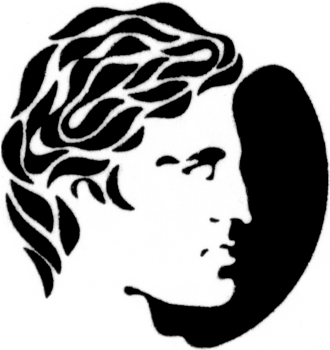
- Company type: Private (1967–1969); Subsidiary (1969–1985)
- Industry: Computer
- Founded: 1967; 59 years ago in San Jose, California, United States
- Founder: Philippe Yaconelli; William Benz; Sung Pal Chur; William Sousa
- Defunct: 1985; 41 years ago
- Fate: Acquired by Electronic Memories & Magnetics, themselves acquired by Titan Systems
- Parent: Electronic Memories & Magnetics (1969–1985)

Caelus Memories, Inc., was an American computer hardware company active from 1967 to 1985 and based in San Jose, California. The company focused on the manufacturing of magnetic data storage media, primarily disk packs. For a time, it was the second-largest manufacturer of disk packs in the world, designing units plug-compatible with IBM and Univac mainframes. In 1969, Caelus was acquired in whole by Electronic Memories & Magnetics; the latter was later acquired by Titan Systems in 1985.

== History ==
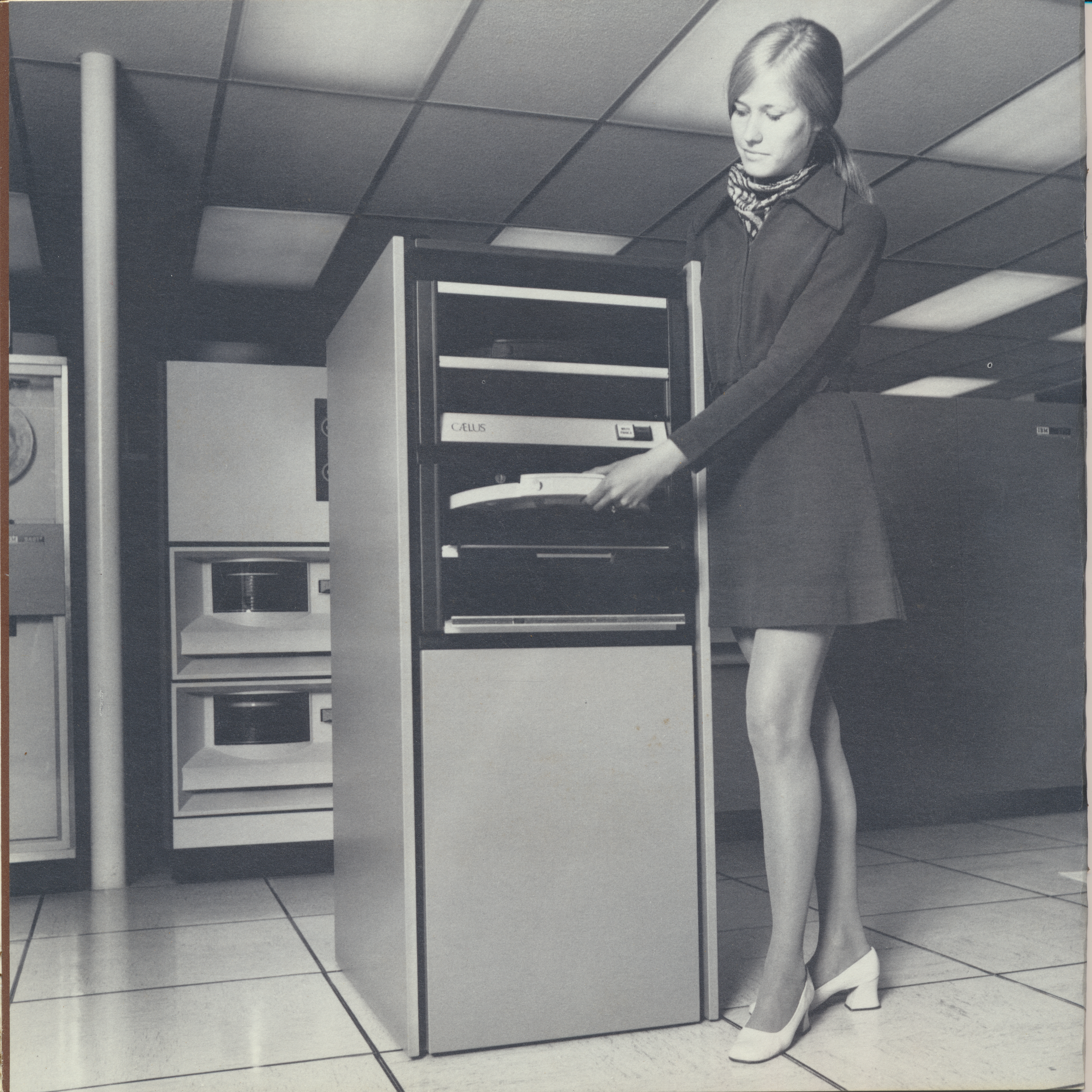
Caelus Memories disk drive unit from 1971

Caelus Memories was principally founded by Philippe Yaconelli in 1967 in San Jose, California. Yaconelli had previously worked for Memorex, where he was one of its first employees, working in Memorex's sales division since 1962. With several other employees from IBM, including William Benz, Sung Pal Chur, and William Sousa, Yaconelli founded Caelus with $200,000 of their own capital, with a further $1.8 million supplied by Electronic Memories & Magnetics (EM&M), a computer memory firm also based in San Jose. Whereas EM&M was a more-diversified firm producing magnetic tape subsystems, core memory, and expansion cards in service of data storage devices, Caleus was chiefly focused on hard disk drive products, namely disk packs.

In September 1967, the company began pilot production of disk packs plug-compatible with IBM's offerings, occupying a facility in San Jose that cost the founders $750,000 to build. Yaconelli described their relationship with IBM as symbiotic in 1967, with the latter eager to supply the licenses for their disk pack patents. Helped by this relationship, Caleus became the second-largest manufacturer of disk packs in the world by July 1968, trailing only IBM. This was only five months after achieving full-scale production from its San Jose facility. The company both sold its drives to end users via distributors as well as taking volume orders from OEM resellers. With a capacity to manufacture up to 40,000 packs per year, Caelus generated roughly £2 million in revenues in less than a year after opening.

Caelus' steady rise was punctuated by their acquisition in full by EM&M in January 1969. The terms of the acquisition were reportedly $3 million in a stock swap. Following the acquisition, Caelus became a subsidiary of EM&M. Yaconelli left to found his second venture, Katun Corporation, a systems integration company, in San Jose. He eventually returned to Memorex, becoming its VP of marketing.

The company shirked developing any Winchester-style drives, preferring to stay loyal with traditional disk packs despite Winchesters steadily overtaking market share since its invention in the early 1970s by IBM. In 1976, Sperry Rand acquired Caelus' San Jose factory from EM&M for an undisclosed sum. Caelus continued to operate as a subsidiary from EM&M's Encino headquarters but stagnated until 1978 when EM&M charged the executive Ed Farris with a turnaround of the division. Caelus continued to lead the disk pack market until their parent company EM&M was acquired by Titan Systems in 1985.
