= Priam Corporation =

Manufacturer of hard disk drives

Priam Corporation was a company located in San Jose, California, founded in 1978 by William Schroeder and Al Wilson, two former Memorex executives, as a manufacturer of hard disk drives. Originally, they made high-capacity 14-inch drives, developed for mainframe computers, available for minicomputers and high-end workstations, but switched to 8-inch disk drives in 1980.

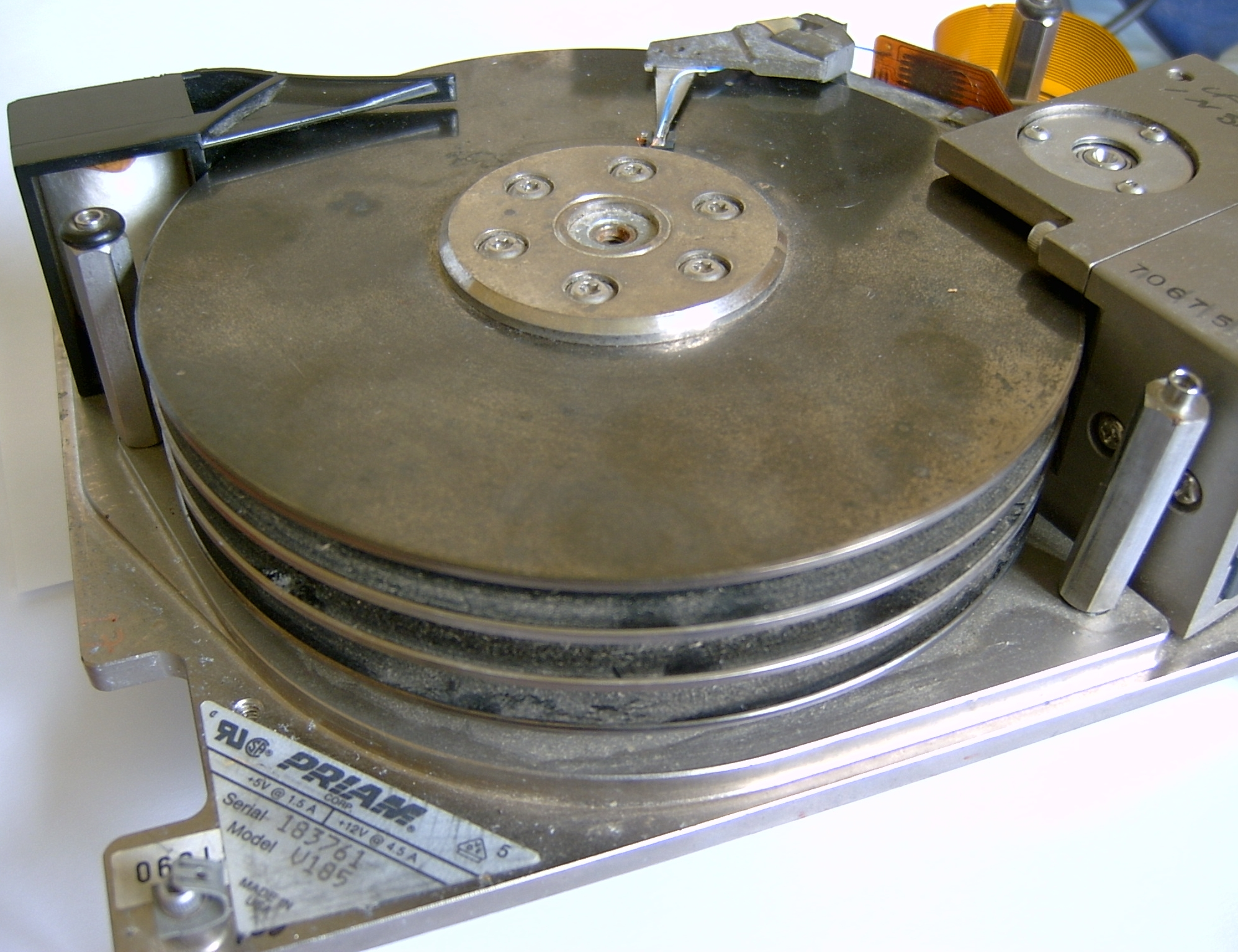
Priam hard disk 72 MB

Their 8-inch hard disks could be found in a wide variety of add-on products like the huge Mator Shark box with IEEE-488 interface for Commodore PET/CBM computers or the Priam DataTower series, external storage solutions, combining high-capacity hard disks and streamers in a single case, which could interface to various computers including IBM PCs.

While Priam was considered a leader in certain technology segments at one time, they were late catching up in the transition to the 5.25-inch form factor and were ultimately one of the many hard drive manufacturers in the 1980s and 1990s that went out of business, merged, or closed their hard drive divisions; as a result of capacities and demand for products increased, and profits became hard to find.

In 1985, Priam dropped their own 5.25-inch drive in-house development and merged with Vertex Peripherals, a company competing in the market for 5.25-inch drives.

In the mid-1980s Priam's InnerSpace series offered fully integrated disk drive solutions to overcome disk capacity limitations imposed by MS-DOS prior to the release of version 3.31/4.0. This included custom hard disk controllers (based on Western Digital designs) as well as dedicated software for formatting (PFMT.EXE) and partitioning (EDISK.EXE). PFMT.EXE placed a driver EVDR.SYS into the root directory of the boot volume. This was used by MS-DOS to retrieve drive and partitioning information located in the last 12 KB of the disk. Priam's EDISK also used dedicated MBR partition IDs 0x45 and 0x5C. Solutions were also offered for NetWare, Unix, and Pick.

Priam opened a manufacturing facility in Taiwan in 1987 to move the production of 5.25-inch drives there.

After having suffered losses since 1985, the company declared bankruptcy in 1989. It was re-established with the help of external investors as Priam Systems Corp. in 1990, led by Wil Cochran as president and Dick Reiser, a founder of Priam, as vice president. Finally, the disk drive business was sold to Prima International of Santa Clara, California, a computer peripherals VAR, in 1991. Service was provided by Sequel.

== See also ==
- List of defunct hard disk manufacturers
- Storage Module Device (SMD)
