= Naturex =

French botanicals company

Naturex is a botanicals company that produces and sells plant extracts to the food industry for flavoring, coloring, or preservative purposes. The company is based in Avignon, France with offices and production facilities across Europe, the United States, Canada, Brazil, Morocco, and India.

== History ==
The company was founded in 1992 by Jacques Dikansky, who served as CEO until his death in 2012. Thierry Lambert took over as CEO until 2014 and was later replaced by Olivier Rigaud in 2018.

Company revenues exceeded $125 million in 2007. In 2015, Europe was 50% of the company’s business, the U.S. market was 40%, and 10% was in emerging markets. The company had over 1700 employees when it was acquired by Swiss company Givaudan SA for $1.6 billion.

In 2018, Naturex was acquired by the Swiss group Givaudan.

== Acquisitions ==
During his 20 years as CEO, Dikansky expanded the company by opening new offices and acquiring other companies. In 1997, the company opened a subsidiary in Mamaroneck, New York to handle its United States business. Naturex's acquisitions have included Brucia Plant Extracts, Hauser, RFI Ingredients, Pure World, Inc., Hammer Pharma, Chart Corporation, the active ingredients division of Berkem, the ingredients division of Natraceutical, Pektowin, Burgundy, Valentine, Decas Botanical Synergies, Vegetable Juices Inc., some parts of Berghausen, some parts of Halliburton International Foods, and Swedish Oat Fiber.
