= Computer Memories, Inc. =

American hard disk drive manufacturer

- Industry: Computer
- Founded: 1979; 47 years ago in Chatsworth, California, United States
- Founder: Raymond Brooke and Abraham Brand
- Defunct: 2005; 21 years ago
- Fate: Acquired by Naturex, S.A.
- Successors: American Holdings, Inc. (1992–1995); Pure World, Inc. (1995–2005)
- Products: Hard disk drives

Computer Memories, Inc. (CMI) was a Chatsworth, California manufacturer of hard disk drives during the early 1980s. CMI made basic stepper motor-based drives, with low cost in mind.

== History ==
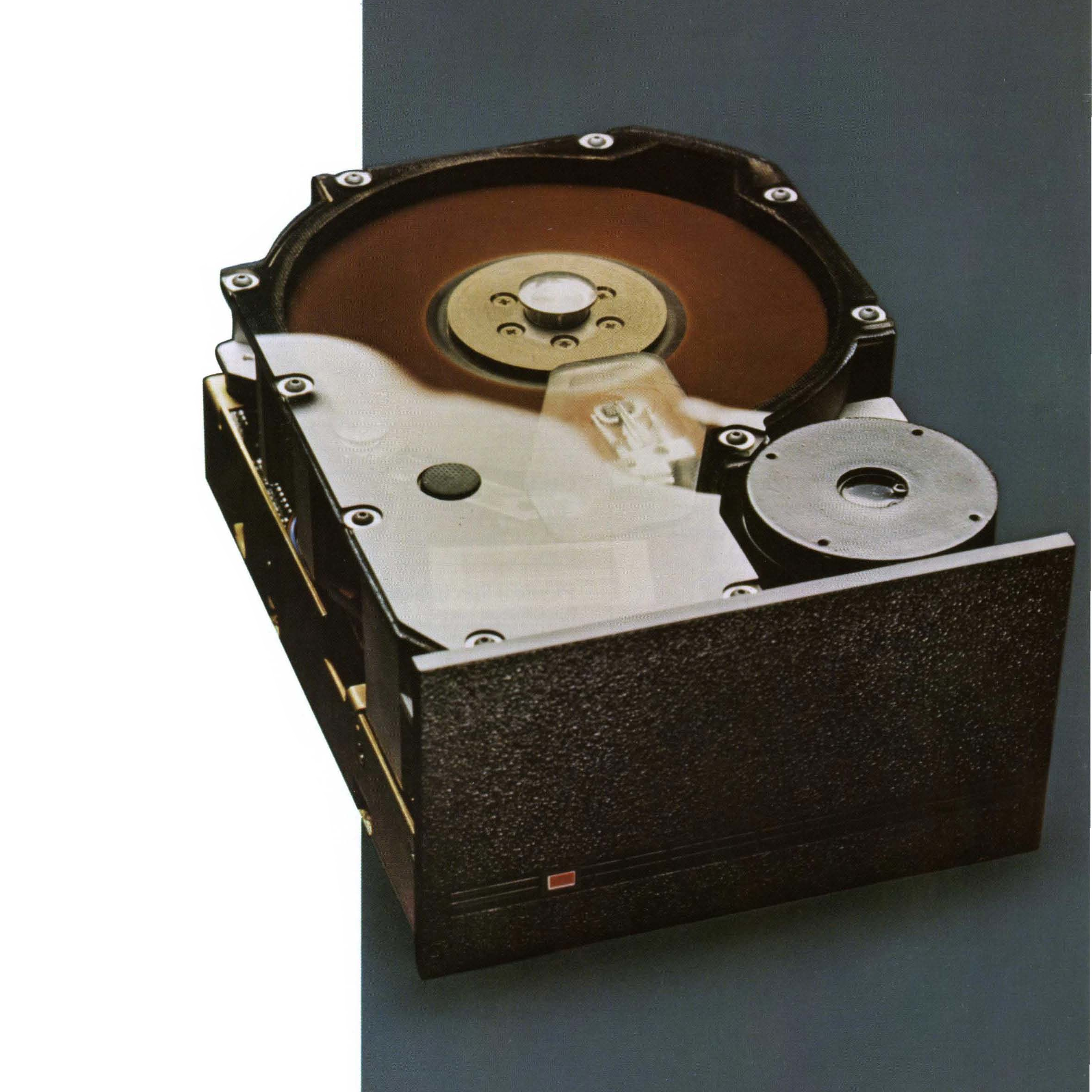
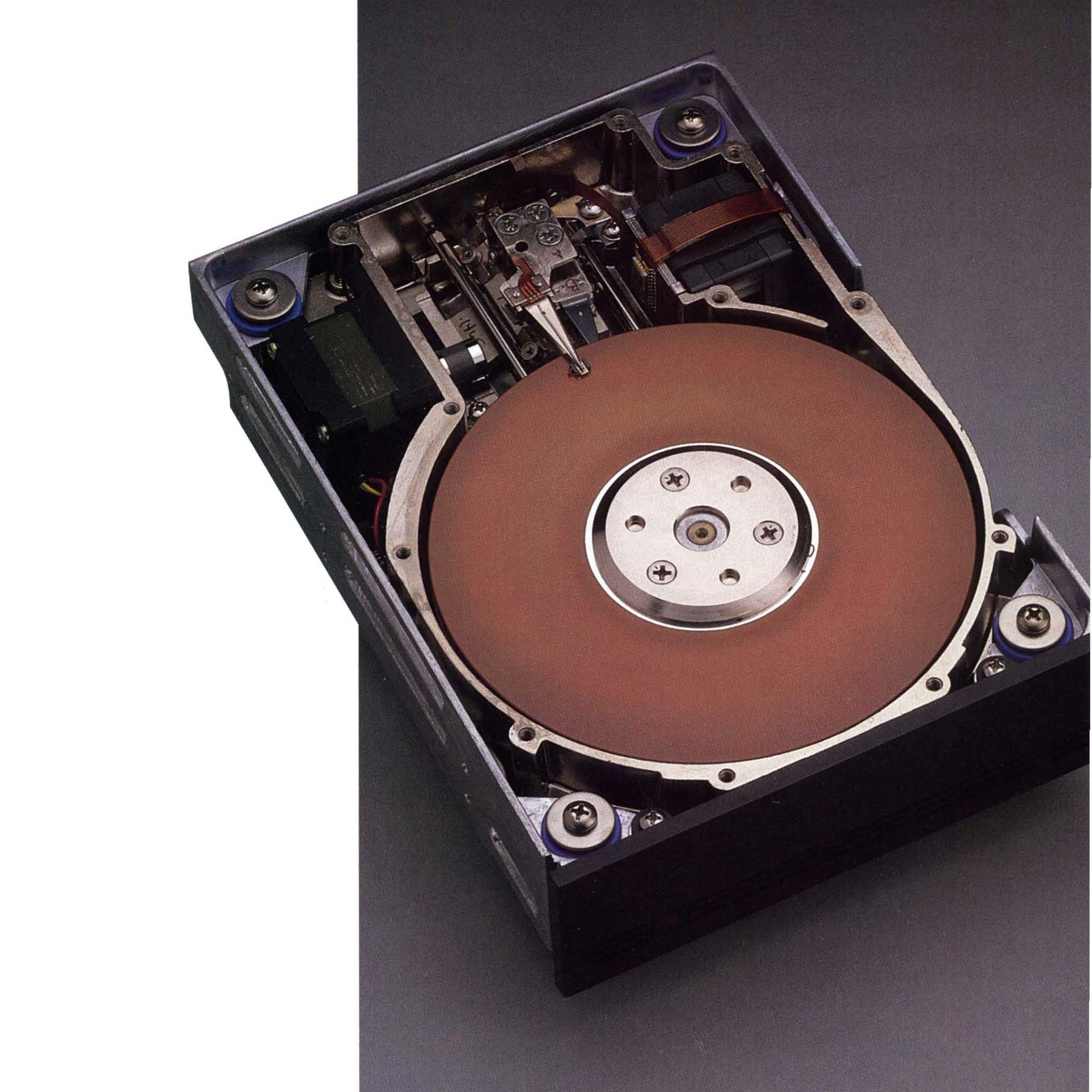
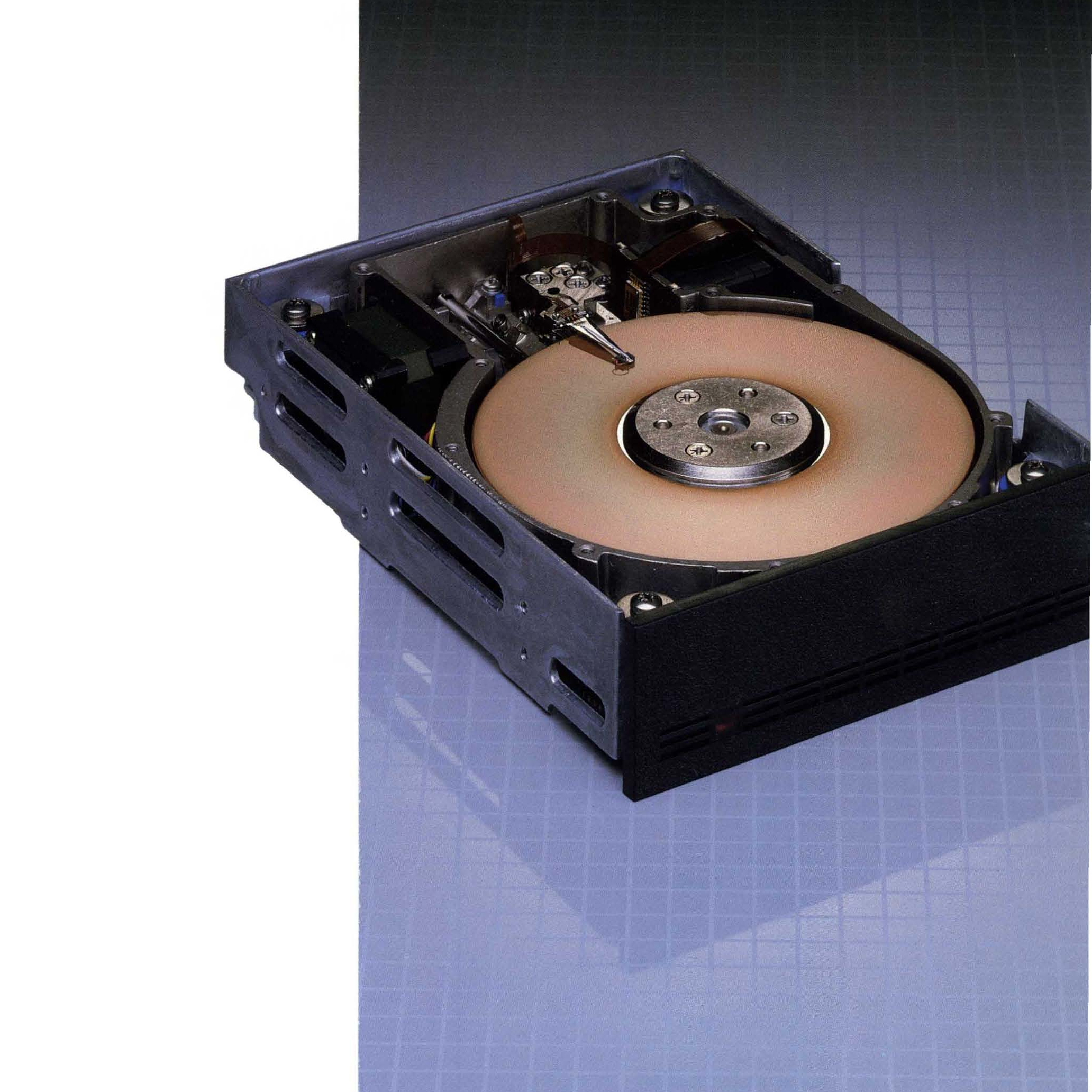
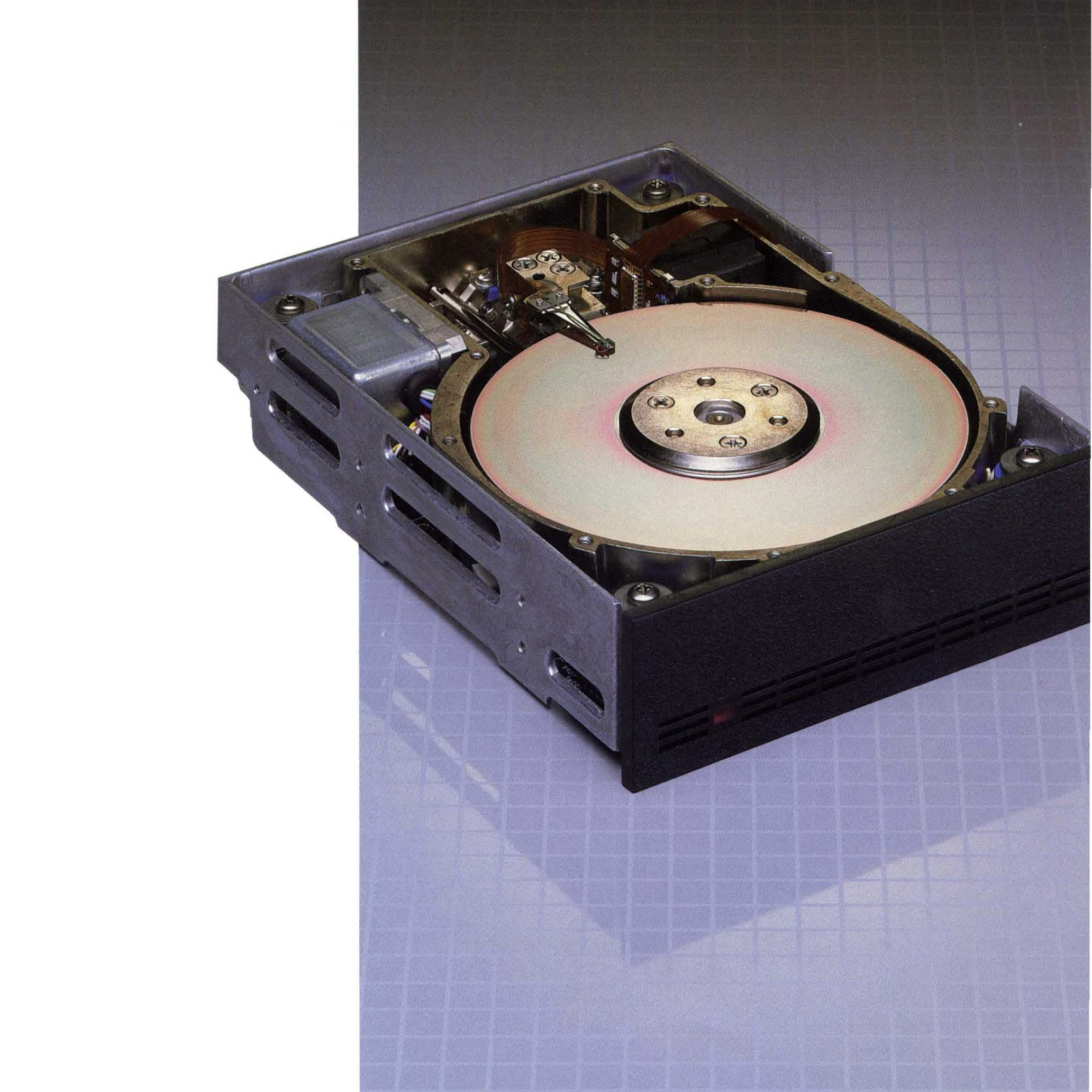
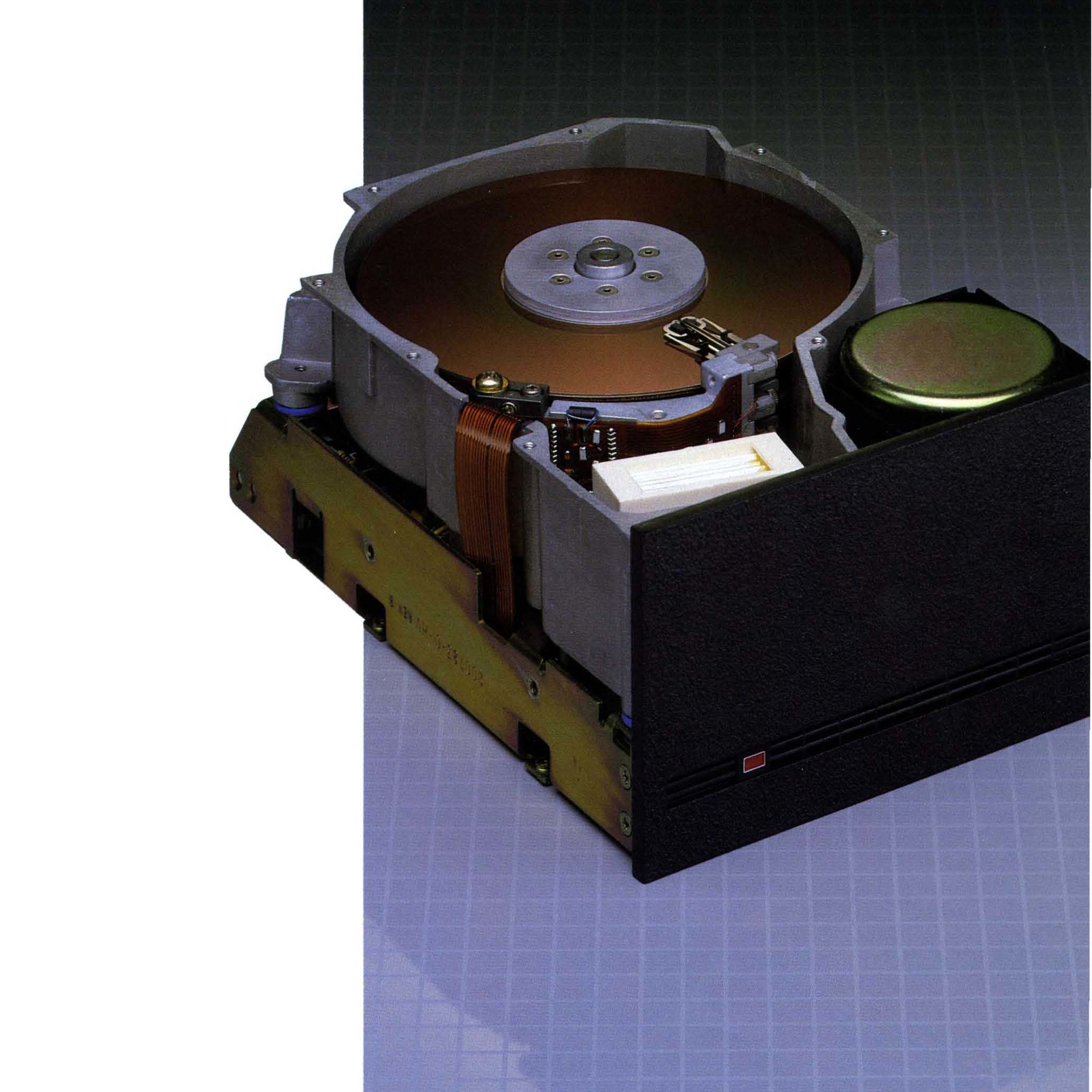
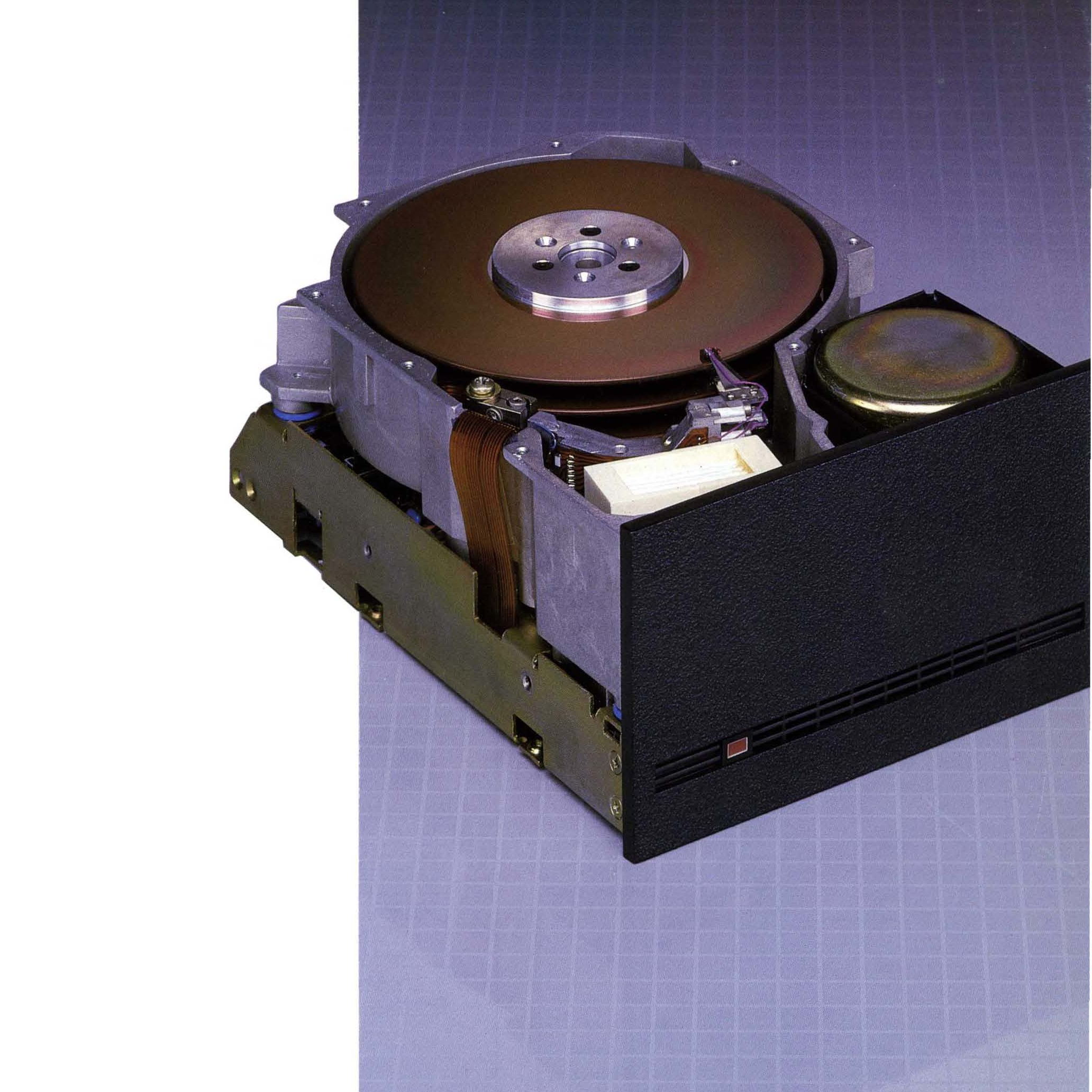
Various drives from Computer Memories, Inc.
Top row: CM5640 (1982); CM3000 (1984); CM3026 (1985)
Bottom row: CM4426 (1985); CM6000 (1985); CM7000 (1986).

The company was founded in 1979 by Raymond Brooke, Abraham Brand, James Willets and James Quackenbush all formerly of Pertec Computer Corporation, with initial seed money from Raymond Brooke and Abraham Brand and investors Irwin Rubin, Frederic Heim and Marshall Butler. It was incorporated August 6, 1979. Initially the company offered three 5 1/4" disk drives with a capacity of 5, 10 or 15 megabytes (unformatted). Early investors in the company included Intel Corporation. The company made an initial public offering on August 23, 1983 of approximately 2,000,000 shares of common stock. August 1984 it secured a major contract as sole producer of 20-megabyte hard drives for the base model of the IBM PC/AT. Unfortunately, the Singapore-manufactured CM6000 drives proved highly unreliable. Dealers reported failure rates as high as 25 to 30 percent. Part of the problem was high demand for the PC/AT; IBM increased its order from 90,000 units in 1984 to 240,000 in 1985, and manufacturing quality suffered. Second, the design of the disk drive subsystem itself was flawed. CMI was unable to keep up with what Brand described as a "very, very aggressive" IBM production plan, and obtained a $6 million emergency loan from an unnamed lender, likely IBM.

At the same time, Quantum Corporation sued CMI for patent infringement relating to the servo mechanism in the entire CM6600 line of drives. Instead of putting the tracking grating on the head arm and driving the arm directly from a voice coil, like the Quantum designs, CMI made a composite motor that would bolt to the drive in place of the usual stepper motor, with the voice coil on the bottom and the tracking mechanism on top (similar to DC servo motors used in process controls and robotics). CMI connected the motor to the arm with a metal-band pulley, the same mechanism they used on their stepper-motor drives. Since the feedback system was behind the pulley, it had to compensate for slack in the arm, one of several things the CMI firmware didn't take account of.

In late 1985 IBM announced that it would no longer use CMI drives after its contract expired at the end of the year. CMI released a "patent-free" 7600 series of drives in 1986, but never recovered from the IBM incident. On July 2, 1986, it announced its departure from hard disk production and marketing—95% of its business. Attempts were made in 1987 to sell the remainder of the company to movie producer Hemdale Film Corporation and to animated television program producer DIC Animation City; however, both deals fell through.

In 1988 the shell corporation, still traded publicly, was acquired by Paul and Natalie Koether of Far Hills, New Jersey who used it as an investment vehicle; in 1992 it was renamed American Holdings, Inc. In 1995 it was renamed Pure World, Inc. after its largest subsidiary, a supplier of kava and other botanical products. Finally, on June 6, 2005, it was acquired by Naturex, S.A., a French competitor.
