= Moving magnet actuator =

A moving magnet actuator is a type of electromagnetic linear actuator. It typically consists of an arrangement of a mobile permanent magnet and fixed coil, arranged so that currents in the coil generate a pair of equal and opposite forces between the coil and magnet.

A voice coil actuator, also called a voice coil motor (VCM), is an electromagnetic linear actuator where the magnet is fixed and the coil is mobile. In this configuration the coil is common called a voice coil.

== See also ==
- Tubular linear motor
