= Sirjang Lal Tandon =

Indian-American businessman

Sirjang Lal "Jugi" Tandon (born c. 1942) is an engineer and entrepreneur, who has founded a number of companies, particularly in the field of computer data storage. He founded disk drive company Tandon Corporation, which created what became the industry-standard double-sided floppy drive disk read-and-write heads. He is chairman and CEO of Celetronix, Inc.

== Education and early career ==
Tandon grew up in Punjab, India. In 1960, he moved to the United States with $3,000, earning a BS at Howard University, master's degree in mechanical engineering at Kansas State University and an MBA at the University of Santa Clara.

He worked as an engineer from 1970 to mid 1975 at IBM and Memorex. In late 1975, he left IBM for Pertec Inc. in Chatsworth, but left that same year to start Tandon Magnetics in his Chatsworth garage with $7,000.

== Tandon Corporation ==
Tandon invented the double-sided floppy drive used by IBM in the IBM PC and worked as OEM manufacturer for Xerox, Tandem Computers and Prime Computer. In late 1982, Tandon was #1 in the disk-drive industry, and his company was named Forbes magazine's "Up and Comer of the Year". The $150-million value of his stock placed "Jugi", at age 41, on the Forbes list of the 400 richest Americans. With this wealth, he built a 30-room home on 20 acres in Chatsworth.

In 1996, Sirjang created JT Storage (Jugi Tandon Storage), back in Chatsworth, CA.
