= Tandon Corporation =

Defunct American computer company (1975–1993)

- Formerly: Tandon Magnetics Corp
- Type: Public
- Industry: Computers
- Founded: 1975; 51 years ago in Chatsworth, California
- Founder: Sirjang Lal Tandon

The Tandon Corporation was an American disk drive and PC manufacturer founded in 1975 (incorporated in 1976 as Tandon Magnetics Corp.) by Sirjang Lal Tandon, a former mechanical engineer. The company originally produced magnetic recording read/write heads for the then-burgeoning floppy-drive market. Due to the labor-intensive nature of the product, production was carried out in low-wage India where production costs were lower. This was the key to the company's competitiveness. In the late 1970s, Tandon developed direct equivalents to Shugart floppy drives, and is credited with the invention of DS/DD (double-sided, double-density) versions which became its primary product in the early 1980s.

In 1979, Tandon introduced the TM100 diskette drive, a 5.25" unit with 40 track support as opposed to the Shugart SA-400's 35 tracks. When Tandy introduced the TRS-80 Model III in 1980, it equipped the computer with TM100 drives. The following year, Tandon obtained an even more lucrative contract when IBM released its Personal Computer. Until 1985, Tandon were the sole supplier of floppy drives for IBM PCs, initially the same single-sided unit used in the TRS-80, then the newer double-sided TM100-2. Tandon would become the world's largest independent producer of disk drives for personal computers and word processors.

In the mid-1980s, Tandon introduced a line of hard disk drives, making several models of the same basic design with a P-shaped top cover and a pinion rack stepper motor off to the side. They also introduced portable hard disk drives that could be easily removed from personal computers. A major decline in North American computer sales during 1984–85 as well as competition from Japanese and Taiwanese manufacturers proved difficult for the company. Tandon in April 1987 purchased hard disk drive maker Atasi Corporation for $5 million in stock. This was done so they could improve the capacity of their disk drive lines, as Atasi offered up to 170 MB while Tandon only did 50 MB. Tandon sold its original data-storage business to Western Digital for nearly $80 million in 1988.

The company then brought in former IBM and other computer industry executives in an attempt to remake the company as a leading producer of personal computers. By 1989, nearly all (90 percent) of its personal computer sales were in Europe, and its stock price had fallen from a 1983 peak of $34.25 to $0.50.

== PCX ==
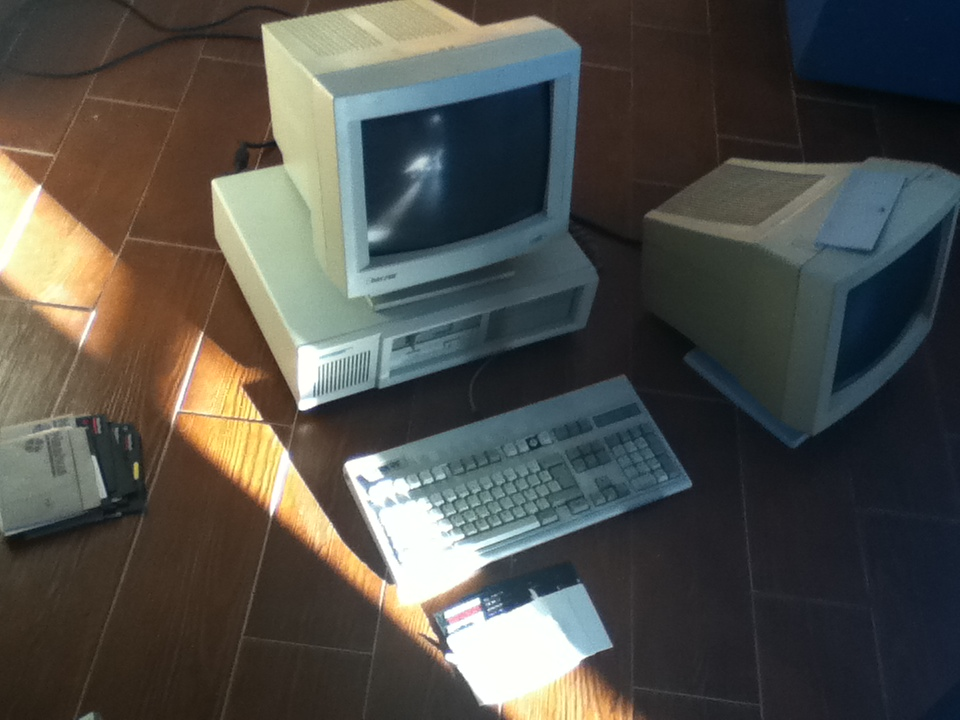
Tandon PCX

The PCX computer was made in 1986. It came normally with 256 KB of RAM, 80 column monitor, 2 x 360 KBs 5 1/4 diskette drives, 1 x 10 MBs hard disk drive, MS-DOS and GW-BASIC.
