= MiniStor =

Defunct American data storage company

MiniStor Peripherals, Inc.
- Company type: Public
- Industry: Computer storage
- Founded: May 1991; 34 years ago in San Jose, California, United States
- Founders: Alex Malaccorto; James "Jim" Miller
- Defunct: April 1995; 30 years ago
- Fate: Bankruptcy liquidation
- Number of employees: 170 (1995, peak)

MiniStor Peripherals, Inc., was a public American computer hardware company based in San Jose, California, and active from 1991 to 1995. The company was the first to manufacture and market PC Card spinning hard drives, based on the 1.8-inch hard drive specification invented earlier by Intégral. The company briefly rode a wave of success in this market before dissolving amid bankruptcy proceedings in April 1995.

== History ==
=== Foundation (1991–1992) ===
MiniStor Peripherals was founded in May 1991 by Alex Malaccorto and James "Jim" Miller in San Jose, California. Both had previously worked for Maxtor Corporation, another manufacturer of hard drives, in various executive positions. MiniStor received seed funding from multiple investors, including Kleiner Perkins Caufield & Byers, amounting to $4.2 million by the time of its incorporation—an uncharacteristically large sum for computer-related seed financing at the time. By January 1992, before the company had any products on the market, the company employed 70 from its San Jose office.

MiniStor was the second company, behind Intégral Peripherals of Colorado, to announce production of 1.8-inch hard drives. The 1.8-inch drive standard attempted to supplant the industry-standard 2.5-inch drive pioneered by PrairieTek in 1988. In September 1991, the company began planning the groundbreaking of a 25,000-square-foot manufacturing plant in Singapore to mass-produce the company's 1.8-inch drives. In opposition to standard practice for developing new hard drive technologies, the company planned to send their specifications for their drives straight to Singapore, skipping domestic production sampling that would have allowed them to fine-tune production. Malaccorto cited the breakneck pace of the disk drive industry as their reason for skipping this process.

=== First products and growth (1992–1994) ===
In March 1992, the company announced their first products, the MiniPort line of hard drives. The first products in this line, the MiniPort 32(P) and the MiniPort 64(P), had formatted capacities of 32 MB and 64 MB respectively; units suffixed with P had a PC Card interface for laptop users, while non-suffixed units had a proprietary straight-through IDE-compatible port for embedded applications. Released in late 1992, the 32P and 64P were the first PC Card spinning hard drives. As customer surveys overwhelmingly saw PC Cards as the breakout application for 1.8-inch drives, MiniStor decided to focus their efforts on this segment. Manufacturing of the MiniPort's controller circuitry, populated with controller chips by Zilog and Adaptec, was performed by nearby GSS/Array Technology. Meanwhile, MiniStor obtained their thin-film magnetic platters from Komag and their read–write heads from Dastek.

The MiniPort drives had a rated MTBF of one hundred thousand stops and starts, significantly lower than Intégral's one million. Miller conceded that Intégral's drives were more reliable because of their ability to park the heads fully off the platter but contended that the drives' traditional landing zone scheme provided enough power cycles for their customer base. A fringe benefit of the traditional scheme was faster spin-up times: MiniStor's drives were able to load up from standby in one second. MiniPort's drives parked the heads into the loading zone via a mechanical latch instead of energizing a magnetic coil, a technique first used by the founder's former employer Maxtor that reduced power draw.

MiniStor grew to 130 employees in early 1993. In January 1993, the company introduced 42-MB and 85-MB versions of the MiniPort. The company's 1.8-inch drive line topped out in raw capacity with the MiniPort 128, introduced in November 1993, which had a formatted capacity of 128-MB (available in IDE and PC Card variants). They were able to eke out more capacity, however, with the announcement of the MP260P3, which used Stac Electronics' disk-compression algorithm on-chip.

Alongside the MiniPort 128, MiniStor also introduced the Dockit Socket, an adapter for desktop computers that slot into either a 5.25-inch or 3.5-inch drive bay and provided the desktop with one PC Card bus slot. The Dockit Socket the first of two non-drive related products sold by MiniStor; the other was a shock-abosrbing, ruggedized rubber casing called the Pocket Socket. In late 1993, MiniStor received capital funding from Hitachi, who also signed a deal with MiniStor to supply the latter with manufacturing lines in Japan in exchange for MiniStor's services in developing both 1.8-inch and 2.5-inch hard drive lines for Hitachi. MiniStor's first 2.5-inch drives, jointly developed with Hitachi, debuted in May 1994.

=== IPO and decline (1994–1995) ===
MiniStor filed its initial public offering in August 1994, underwritten by Punk, Ziegel & Knoell and D. Blech & Company. The company's stock valuation dropped dramatically after its principal underwriter D. Blech collapsed on September 22, 1994 (so-called "Blech Thursday") after failing to meet Nasdaq's capital requirements. MiniStor briefly manufactured desktop 3.5-inch hard drives before filing Chapter 11 bankruptcy in April 1995 with plans to liquidate its assets.

== See also ==
- Microdrive
- HP Kittyhawk
