= Bigfoot (disambiguation) =

Bigfoot is a large, hairy, mythical humanoid creature in North American folklore and popular culture.

Bigfoot or Big Foot may also refer to:

== Film and TV ==
- Bigfoot (1970 film), a feature film
- Bigfoot (2009 film), a comedy film
- Bigfoot (2012 film), a made-for-television film
- Bigfoot Superstar, a 2020 animated sequel film to 2018's "The Son of Bigfoot"
- Bigfoot, an animated series television pilot
- "Big Foot" (The Goodies), a 1982 episode of The Goodies
- Harry and the Hendersons, titled Bigfoot and the Hendersons in the UK, a 1987 American comedy film directed and produced by William Dear

== Music ==
- Shanks & Bigfoot, a British songwriting/production duo
- Bigfoot, an album by Cayucas (2013)
- Big Foot (album), an album by Melinda Sullivan and Larry Goldings (2024)
- WBRM and simulcast partner WZGM, radio stations licensed to Marion, North Carolina and Black Mountain, North Carolina respectively and branded as Bigfoot Country 96.1 & 103.9

=== Songs ===
- "Big Foot" (Nicki Minaj song), 2024
- "Big Foot" (Charlie Parker composition), a 1948 jazz standard
- "Big Foot" (Nico Touches the Walls song), 2009
- "Bigfoot", a 2014 single by the Dutch disc-jockeys group W&W
- "Big Foot", a 1967 single by Dick Curless
- "Big Foot", a song by P-Model from the 1993 album Big Body
- "Big Foot", a song by Chickenfoot from the 2001 album Chickenfoot III
- "Big Foot", a song by New Grass Revival from the 1989 album Friday Night in America
- "Bigfoot", a song by Béla Fleck and the Flecktones from the 1996 album Live Art
- "Bigfoot", a song by Math the Band from 2009 album Don't Worry

== Sports ==
- Bigfoot (truck), a famous monster truck
- Bigfoot 200, an annual ultramarathon, held in Washington, US

== People ==
- Jerome Brailey (born 1950), drummer also known as Bigfoot
- Mamongazeda ("Big Foot"), 18th-century Ojibwa chief
- Andrew Martin (1975–2009), professional wrestler, stage name, due to his "big boot" finishing move
- Matthew McGrory (1973–2005), American actor and Howard Stern Show regular, also known as Bigfoot
- Mitchell Schwartz (born 1989), National Football League offensive tackle with a size 18 shoe
- Antônio Silva (fighter) (born 1979), MMA fighter
- Spotted Elk (1826–1890), Lakota Sioux chief later also known as Big Foot
- William A. A. Wallace (1817–1899), Texas Ranger also known as Bigfoot

== Places ==
=== United States ===
- Bigfoot, Texas, a town
- Big Foot Prairie, Illinois and Wisconsin, an unincorporated community
- Big Foot High School, Wisconsin
- Big Foot Airfield, Wisconsin

== Companies ==
- Bigfoot Biomedical, a Type 1 Diabetes medical technology company
- Bigfoot Entertainment, a movie production company
- Bigfoot International, a dot-com era holding company
- Bigfoot 4×4, Inc, the company that owns and operates Bigfoot (truck)

== Other ==
- Bigfoot (hard drive), a computer storage product
- Bigfoot (video game), a 1990 video game by Acclaim for Nintendo Entertainment System
- Bigfoot: Collision Course, a 2008 video game by Zoo Games
- A nickname for the first Narco-submarine seized by United States Coast Guard
- Bigfoot, a member of S.H.A.D.E. from DC Comics
- Big Foot, an oil field in the Gulf of Mexico, 362 km south of New Orleans
