= DataPlay =

Obsolete optical disc-based storage medium

DataPlay Inc.
- Type: Incorporation
- Founded: 1998
- Founder: Steve Volk
- Headquarters: Longmont, Colorado, USA
- Key people: Bill Almon, Jr., CEO and President; Jeff Roberts, CFO
- Products: DataPlay Engine; DataPlay 500MB Optical Media
- Number of employees: ~30 (2006)
- Website: www.DataPlay.com (defunct)

DataPlay is an optical disc system developed by DataPlay Inc. and released to the consumer market in 2002. Using tiny (32mm-diameter) disks enclosed in a protective cartridge, it stored 250MB per side and was intended primarily for portable music playback. However, it could also store other types of data using pre-recorded disks and user-recorded disks (and disks that combined pre-recorded content with a writable area). It supported multisession recording. DataPlay Inc. was founded in 1998 by Steve Volk. The company's namesake optical disc won the CES Best of Show award in 2001.

DataPlay also included an elaborate digital rights management (DRM) system designed to allow consumers to "unlock" extra pre-recorded content on the disk at any time, through the internet, following the initial purchase. It was based on the Secure Digital Music Initiative's DRM system. DataPlay's DRM system was one of the reasons behind its attractiveness to the music industry. It also included a proprietary file system, DataPlay File System (DFS) which natively supported DRM. By default, it would allow up to 3 copies to other DataPlay discs, without allowing any copies to CDs.

== History ==
DataPlay Inc. was founded by Steve Volk in 1998. Volk had founded DataPlay in the aftermath of his second company Intégral Peripherals going bankrupt in 1998. Intégral was the first to manufacture 1.8-inch hard drives—at the time the smallest form factor for hard drives—for laptops and other mobile computing devices, starting in 1992. Volk intended for Intégral to supplant the industry-standard 2.5-inch hard drive form factor introduced by PrairieTek—the first company that Volk had co-founded. After the failure of Intégral, Volk decided to focus on the optical media sector.

The recorded music industry was initially generally supportive of DataPlay, and a small number of pre-recorded DataPlay disks were released, including the Britney Spears album Britney. Graphics on press releases show that Sting and Garth Brooks were also set to have DataPlay releases. In 2021, the first DIY DataPlay album was released by the experimental rave producer Backmasker. However, as a pre-recorded format, DataPlay was a failure. In 2002, DataPlay Inc. closed due to a lack of funding. In 2003, a company called DPHI bought DataPlay's intellectual property and reintroduced it at CES 2004. The company swapped DataPlay's DFS file system for the FAT file system. Again, they were marketed as a cheaper alternative to memory cards, with a device being designed that would allow users to transfer data from an SD card to a cheaper DataPlay disc. Each disc would hold 500 megabytes of data and be sold at just US$4.50. DPHI also prototyped 750 megabyte DataPlay discs and announced plans for 2 and 7 gigabyte discs, the latter of which would use a blue-violet semiconductor laser, just like Blu-ray.

Very few products were seen on the market that could write data to these discs. Most notable was the Topy Mini Writer, which retailed for US$130 and housed an optical pickup unit (image No.4) with a USB interface board, allowing the use of DataPlay discs much like other end-user writable optical media (e.g., CD-Rs). Other products were the iriver IDP-100 and the MTV Video Device "MTV FLIP", which both housed the prototype-based model (image No.2).

DataPlay discs were first proposed as a low-cost alternative to memory cards, which used to cost US$3 per megabyte. Blank DataPlay discs, by comparison, would hold 500 megabytes of data at US$10 per disc. They are also expected to have a 100-year lifespan. The discs would be made out of polycarbonate, just like CDs, but would be just 0.6mm thick, just like one half of a DVD (DVDs are made up of two halves that are bonded using glue; usually only one (side) contains data). Rewritable DataPlay discs would be similar to CDs, using a phase change alloy protected by a silicon oxide layer. Mastered (replicated) DataPlay discs would combine both pits and lands to store mastered data and grooves containing a wobble frequency to store rewritable data. Like on CDs, the wobble frequency would store time data to position the laser on the disc precisely.

It has two rewritable areas: one for user data and the other for encrypted data. The latter of which would hold the decryption keys necessary to unlock the extra content. They also have a burst cutting area to uniquely identify each disc. DataPlays can transfer data at 1 megabyte per second.

Other trademark names:

- DaTARIUS
- DPHI
- DataPlay

== Gallery ==
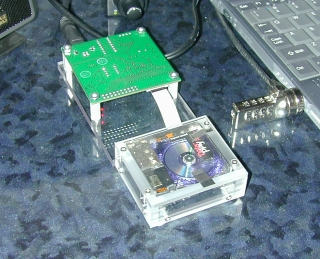
DataPlay optical drive engine development photo of a development platform for testing and demo

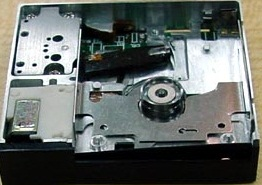
DataPlay optical drive engine internals viewed from above a unit produced without any top cover; above the circular piece is the laser pickup. The laser pickup is built on a piece of silicon.

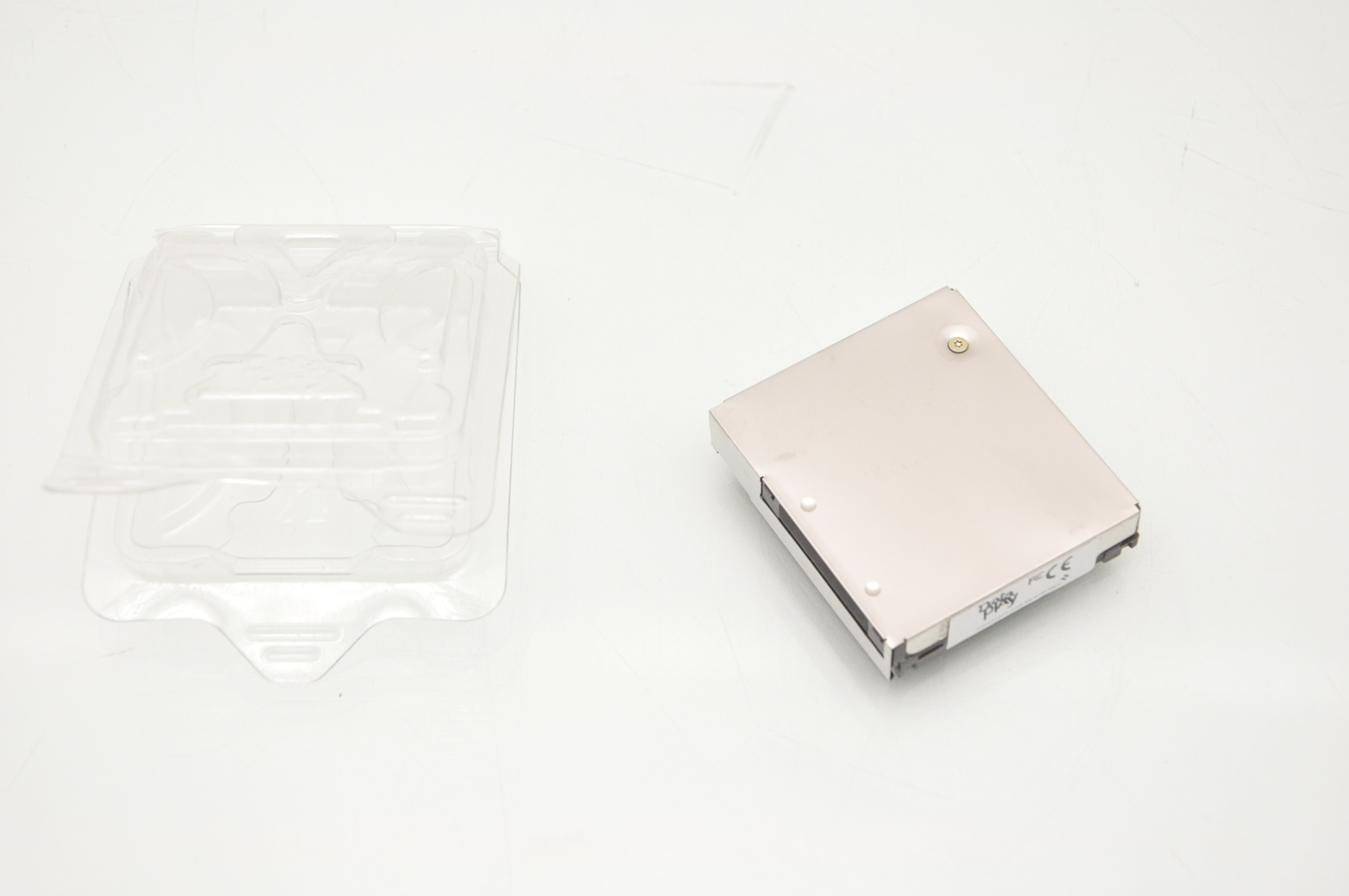
DataPlay optical drive engine with its case (a never-used piece from a private collection)

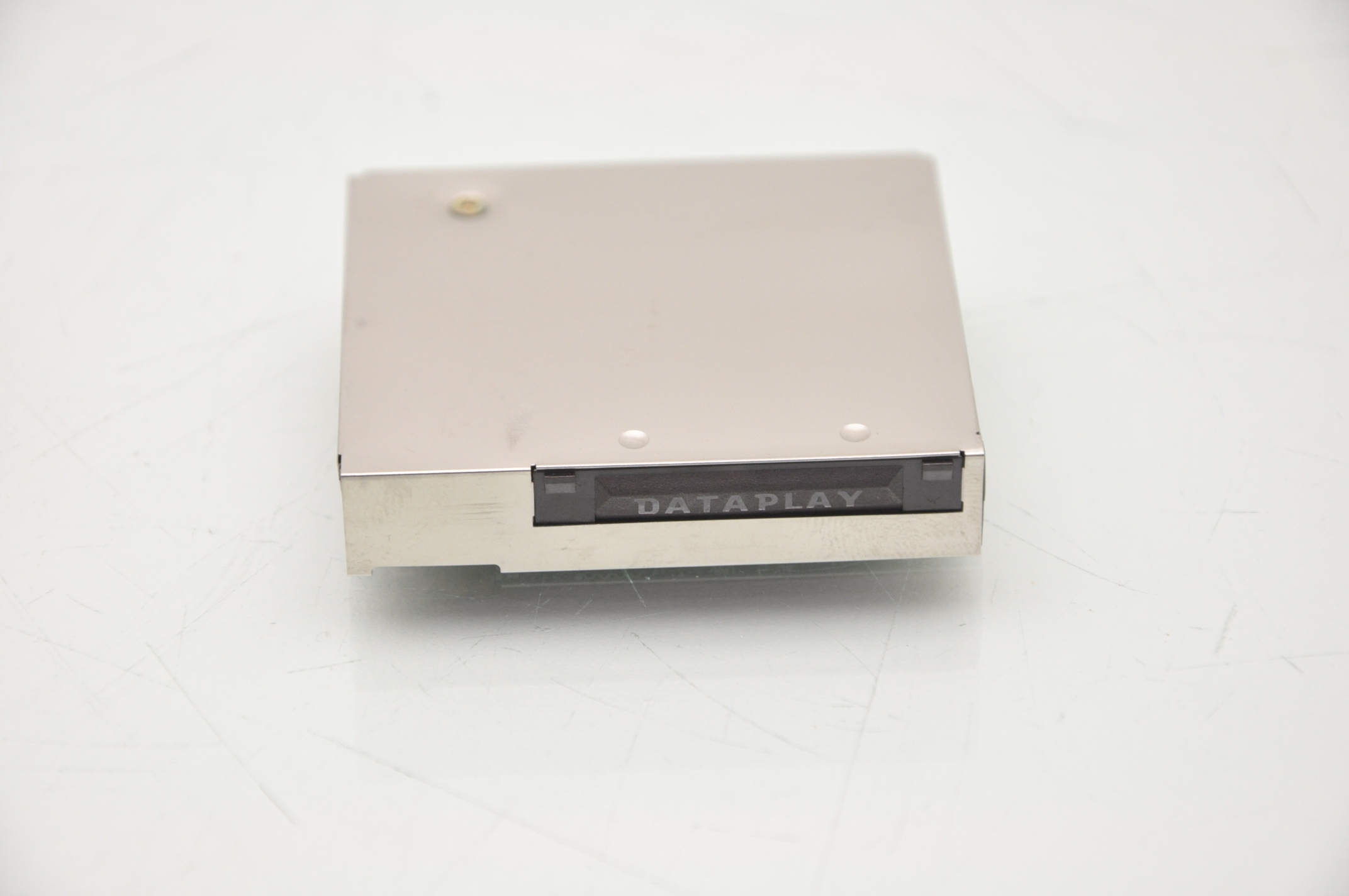
DataPlay optical drive engine top (same as No.3)

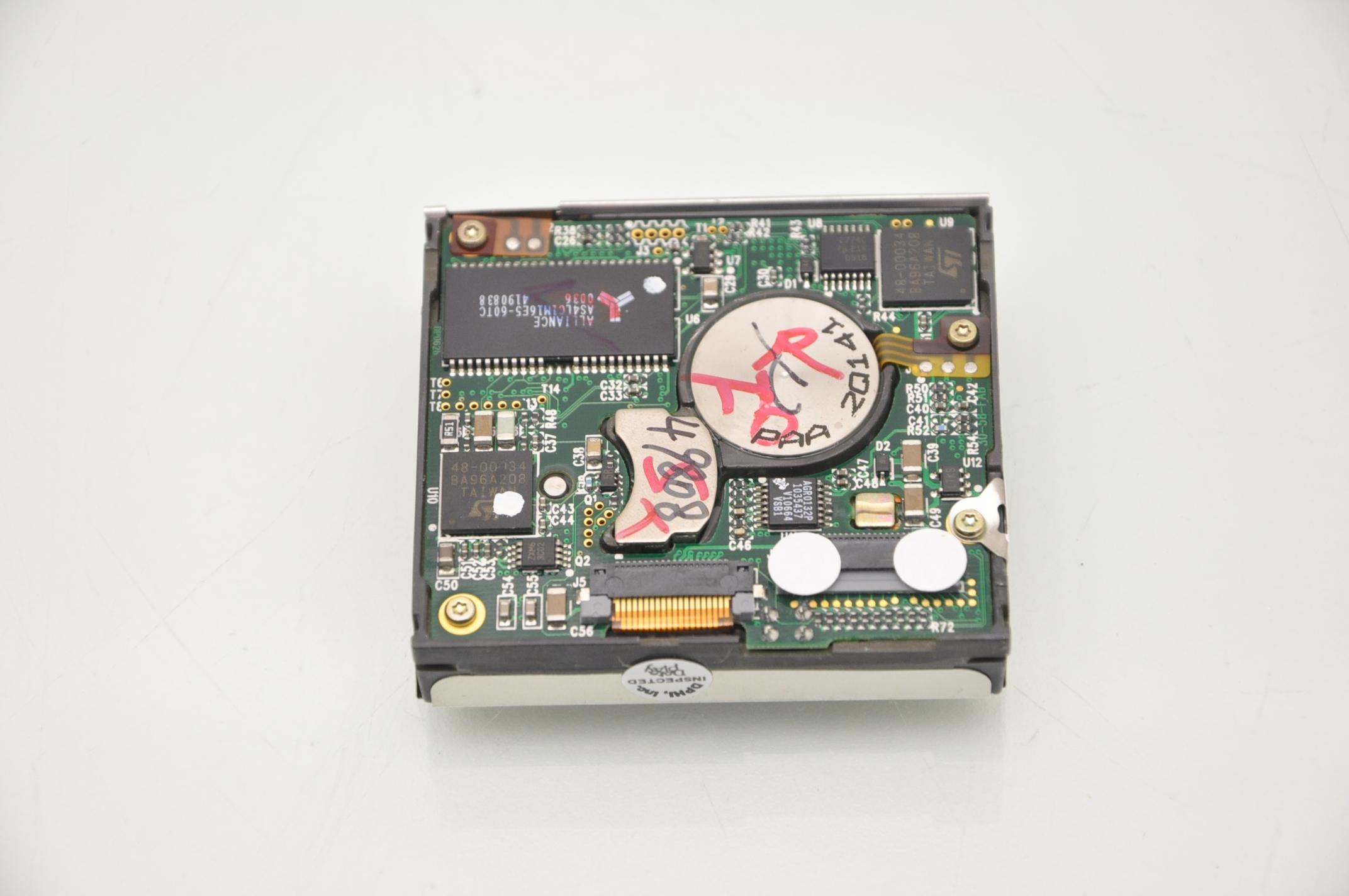
DataPlay optical drive engine bottom (same as No.3) The large coin-like object is a motor for spinning the disc, and the metal piece at its left is a magnet; the laser pickup of the drive is mounted on an arm that is moved using a mechanism, the latter two of which are reminiscent of that of modern hard disks.
