= WAVJ =

WAVJ may refer to:

- WAVJ (FM), a radio station (103.3 FM) licensed to Waterbury, Vermont, United States
- WWKY-FM, a radio station (104.9 FM) licensed to Providence, Kentucky, which held the call sign WAVJ from 1994 to 2017
- WZGM, a radio station (1350 AM) licensed to Black Mountain, North Carolina, United States, which held the call sign WAVJ from 1990 to 1993
