= Drive bay =

Standard-sized area for adding drives or other hardware to a computer

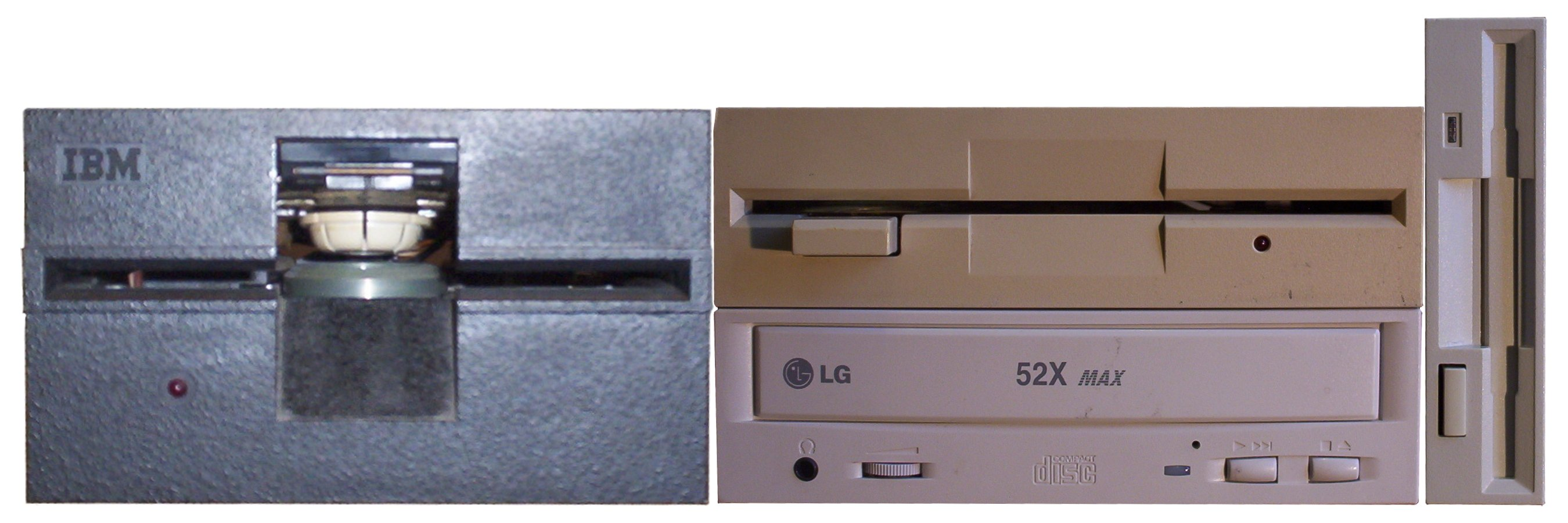
From left to right: full-height 5.25″ drive, two half-height 5.25″ drives, and (sideways) a 3.5″ drive

A drive bay is a standard-sized area for adding hardware to a computer. Most drive bays are fixed to the inside of a case, but some can be removed.

Over the years since the introduction of the IBM PC, it and its compatibles have had many form factors of drive bays. Four form factors are in common use today, the 5.25-inch, 3.5-inch, 2.5-inch or very rarely 1.8-inch drive bays in niche and mostly older portable devices. The 3.5 inch is the most common bay in use today. These names do not refer to the width of the bay itself, but rather to the width of the disks used by the drives mounted in these bays.

== Form factors ==
=== 8.0-inch ===
8.0-inch drive bays were found in early IBM computers, CP/M computers, and the TRS-80 Model II. They were 4 5/8 inches (117.5 mm) high, 9 1/2 inches (241.3 mm) wide, and approximately 14 1/4 inches (361.9 mm) deep, and were used for hard disk drives and floppy disk drives. This form factor is obsolete, a famous example being the Shugart SA1000 winchester drive. Later models of floppy drives like the Shugart SA810 HH from 1982 were 12 inches deep and 2 inches high and didn’t require any AC power too. 8 inch floppy drives often needed 24V+ DC while HDDs required mains AC.

=== 5.25-inch ===
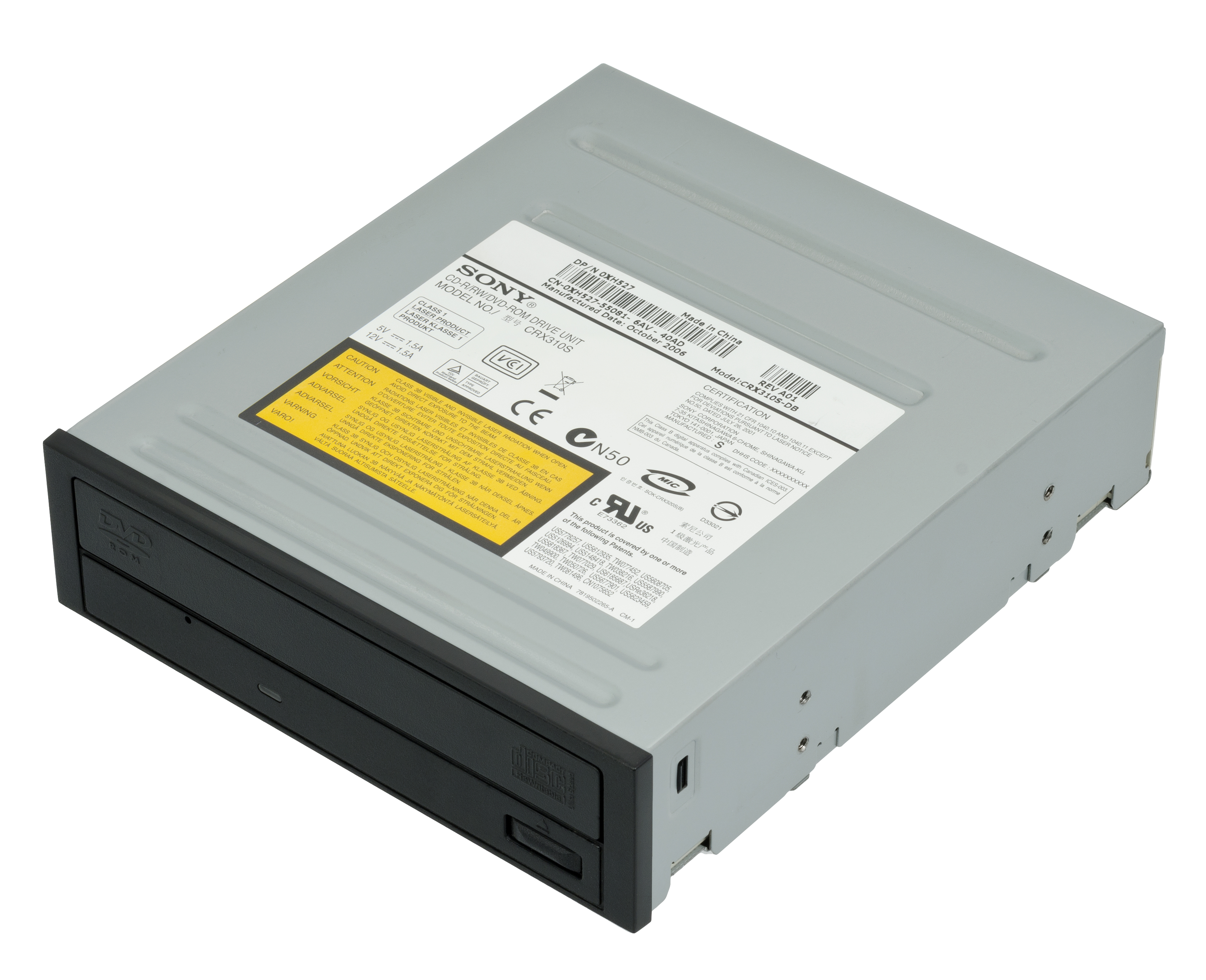
A 5.25-inch half-height DVD drive.

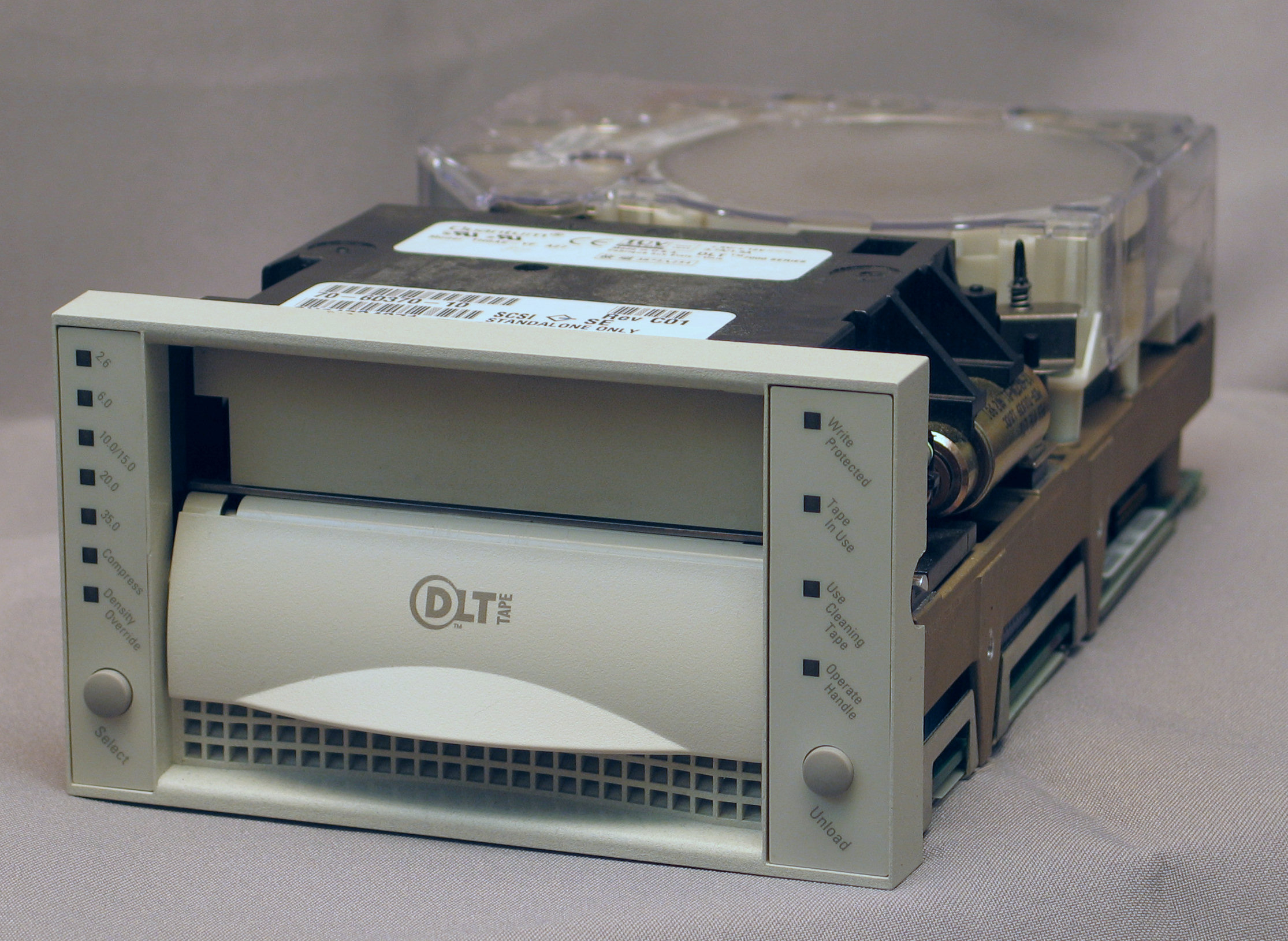
A 5.25-inch full-height DLT tape drive.

5.25-inch drive bays are divided into two height specifications, full-height and half-height.

Full-height bays were found in old PCs in the early to mid-1980s. They were 3 1/4 inches (82.6 mm) high, 5 3/4 inches (146.1 mm) wide, and up to 8 inches (203.2 mm) deep, used mainly for hard disk drives and floppy disk drives. This is the size of the internal (screwed) part of the bay, as the front side is actually 5 7/8 inches (149.2 mm). The difference between those widths and the name of the bay size is because it is named after the size of floppy that would fit in those drives, a 5.25-inch-wide square.

Half-height drive bays are 1 5/8 inches (41.3 mm) high by 5 3/4 inches (146.1 mm) wide, and are the standard housing for CD and DVD drives in modern desktop computers (newer models are usually 7" deep, any deeper is for older or specific high performance models). This form factor originally appeared in the early PC AT era and was at that time used for 5.25-inch floppy disk drives and the hard disk drives of the time (roughly between 10 and 100 MB). As the name indicates, two half-height devices can fit in one full-height bay. Some 5.25 floppy drives are also shorter at 6.5-7.5 inches but this was quite rare.

Both full-height and half-height 5.25-inch bays were typically designed with a case opening at the front of the bay, needed for removable media, but also normally used by 5.25-inch hard disk drives for a front panel with a drive activity LED.

The dimensions of a 5.25-inch floppy drive are specified in the SFF standard specifications which were incorporated into the EIA-741 "Specification for Small Form Factor 133.35 mm (5.25 in) Disk Drives" by the Electronic Industries Association (EIA). Dimensions of 5.25 optical drives are specified in the SFF standard (they are somewhat shorter and not only size of the body is standardized, but also size of the bezel).

=== 3.5-inch ===
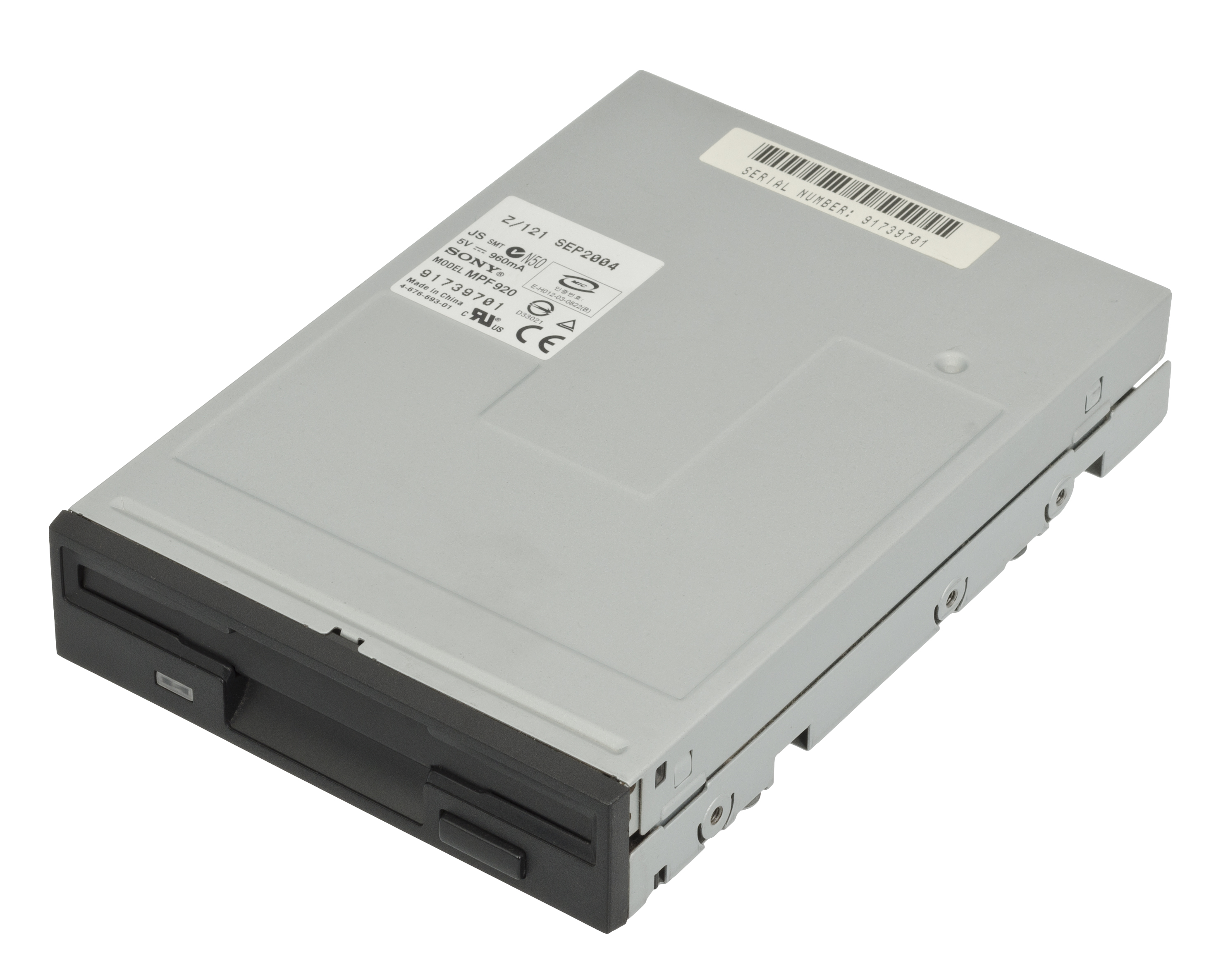
A 3.5-inch floppy drive

3.5-inch bays, like their larger counterparts, are named after diskette dimensions; the current dimensions, originally known as "slim height" is 4 inches (101.6 mm) wide by 1.028 inches (26.1 mm) high. The original "full-height" 3.5-inch hard drives and their drive bays were 1 5/8 inches (41.3 mm) high, the same as half-height 5.25" units. The 41.3mm drives and bays are obsolete today last used in the late 90s and early 00s. Bays with an opening in the front of the case are generally used for vintage floppy or Zip drives, but early hard disks from the 80s/90s used such bays too and had a front panel with an activity LED just like floppy drives. Modern hard drives do not have a front panel a and are mounted in fully internal 3.5" bays without a front opening. The slim 26.1mm drive became dominant by the mid 90s for HDDs being used for enterprise drives only by the late 90s up to the early 00s when fully phased out. Modern computers do not come with a floppy drive at all, and may lack any externally accessible 3.5" bays. There are adapters, sometimes called a "sled", which can be used to mount a 3.5" device in a 5.25" bay. New computers rarely have a 5.25 bay and if so often just one but some OEMs may include up to two 5.25 bays and some special retail custom cases have three (very rare). Vintage obsolete cases may have had up to five 5.25 bays but those were phased out by the late 2000s.

More recently, it is becoming common to use 3.5" bays for smart card and memory card readers, or for panels with additional USB ports. A 3.5" drive containing both a card reader and a floppy drive, as well as a USB port, is also available.

The dimensions of a 3.5" drive are specified in the SFF standard specifications SFF-8300 and SFF-8301, which were incorporated into the EIA-740 specification by the Electronic Industries Association (EIA).

=== 2.5-inch ===
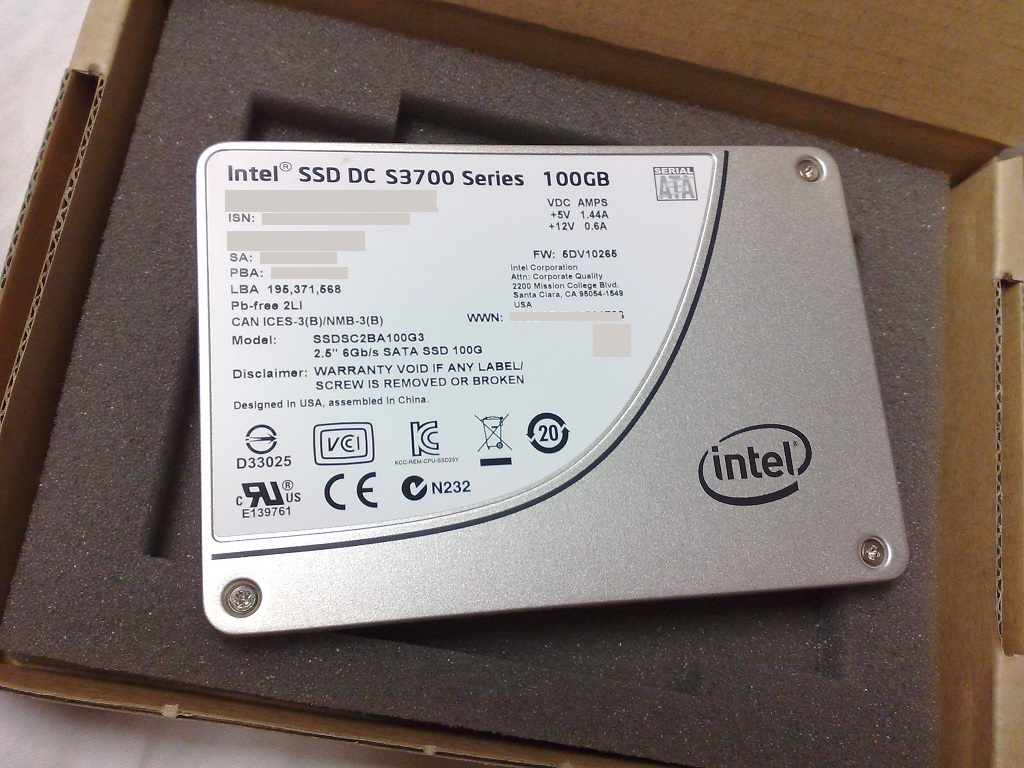
A 2.5-inch solid-state drive (SSD)

For 2.5-inch bays, actual dimensions are 2 3/4 inches (69.9 mm) wide, between 5 millimetres (0.20 in) and 3/4 inch (19.1 mm) high, and 3.955 inches (100.5 mm) deep. However, most laptops have drive bays smaller than the 15 mm specification(often up to 9.5mm, very rarely 12.5mm in the past). 2.5-inch hard drives may range from 7 mm to 15 mm in height. There are two heights that appear to be prominent. 9.51 mm size drives are predominantly used by laptop manufacturers. 2.5-inch Velociraptor and some higher capacity drives (above 2 TB), are 15 mm in height. The greater height of the 15 mm drives allows more platters and therefore greater data capacities. Many laptop drive bays are designed to be removable trays in which the drives are mounted, to ease removal and replacement. 9.5mm used to be standard for 2.5 hard drives until the early 2010s due to a push for thinner devices when they transitioned to 7mm.

The dimensions of a 2.5-inch drive are specified in the SFF standard specifications SFF-8200 and SFF-8201, which were incorporated into the EIA-720 specification by the Electronic Industries Association (EIA).

=== 1.8-inch ===
1.8-inch bays have two specifications, a 60 mm × 70 mm form factor, and a 54 mm × 78 mm form factor. The actual dimensions of the 60 mm × 70 mm are 2.75 in wide by 0.276–0.374 in high and 2.362 in deep (69.85 mm × 7–9.5 mm × 60 mm). The actual dimensions of the 54 mm × 78 mm are 2.126 in wide by 0.197 or 0.315 in high and 3.091 in deep (54 mm × 5 or 8 mm × 78.5 mm). These drives have been used in small devices, including as add-ons to game systems historically. This form factor is virtually absent from new computers and laptops due to the preference of 2.5 drives HDDs/SSDs which have a significantly higher capacity and for SSDs the M.2 form factor which is much more compact and can also use the PCIe interface making them much faster than SATA-based SSDs.

The dimensions of a 1.8-inch drive are specified in the SFF standard specifications SFF-8111 and SFF-8120, which were incorporated into the EIA-720 specification by the Electronic Industries Association (EIA).

== Usage ==
Drive bays are most commonly used to store disk drives, although they can also be used for front-end USB ports, I/O bays, memory card readers, fans, fan controllers, RAID controllers, tool storage, and other uses. Some computers have a small system monitor LCD mounted in a drive bay.

When installing a drive in a bay, it is usually secured with four screws that hold the drive in the bay, although toolless fasteners are becoming more common. Then, any necessary power, data transfer, and other cables are routed into and connected to the rear of the drive. The drive bay is usually just big enough for the drive to fit inside. Since computers have 12 V rails on their motherboards, some computer hobbyist websites even sell addons for cigarette lighter receptacles to power or recharge devices made to draw power from automobiles, though USB is already available for charging devices like cell phones and portable media players.

Drive bay-compatible computer case accessories that do not connect to the motherboard or power supply at all are also common, such as small storage drawers or even cup holders.

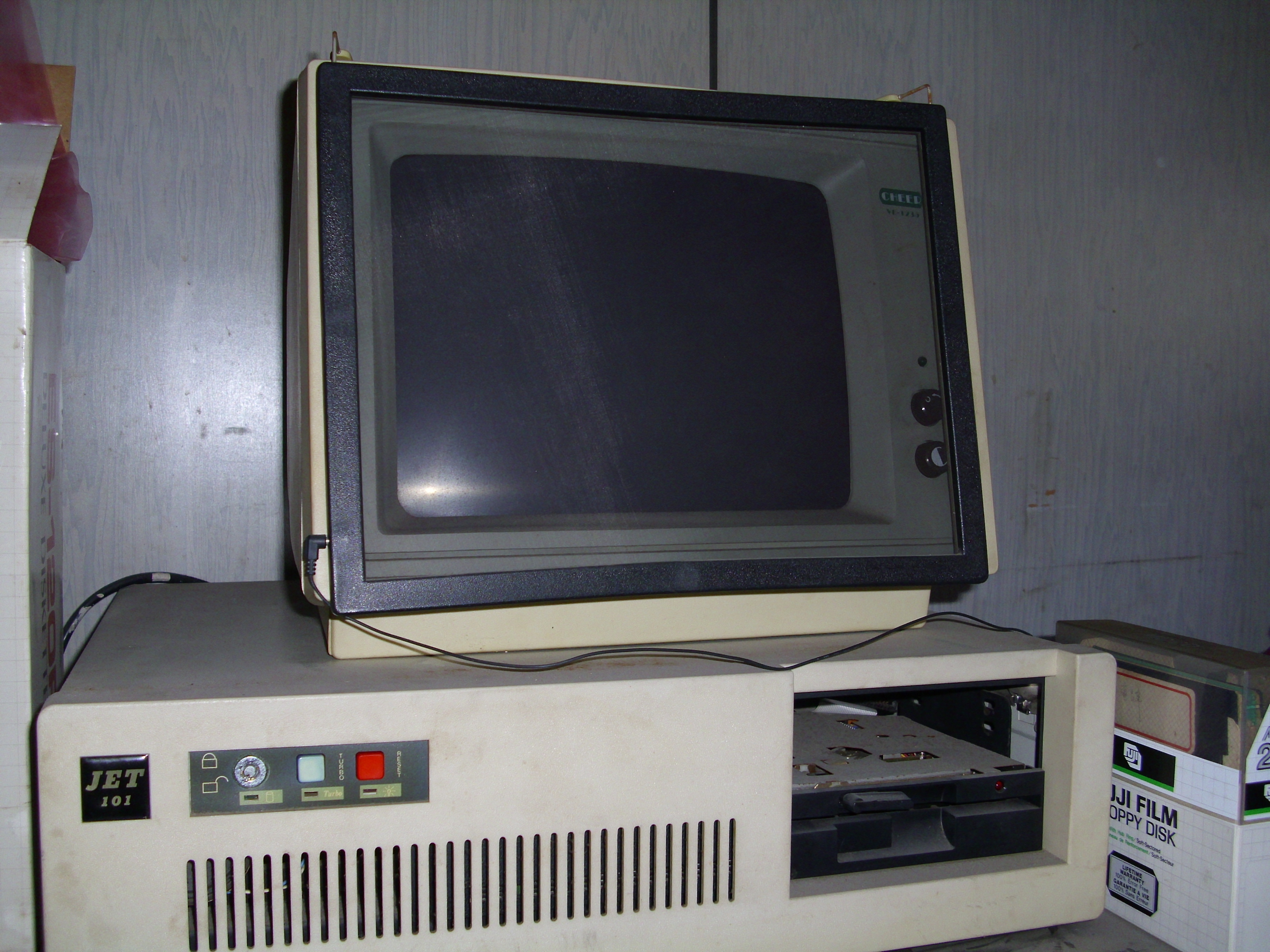
A 1980s white box IBM PC compatible with one full-height 5.25-inch drive bay containing a half-height 5.25-inch floppy drive (Note: The remaining half-height bay usually contained an additional floppy drive or a hard disk drive.)

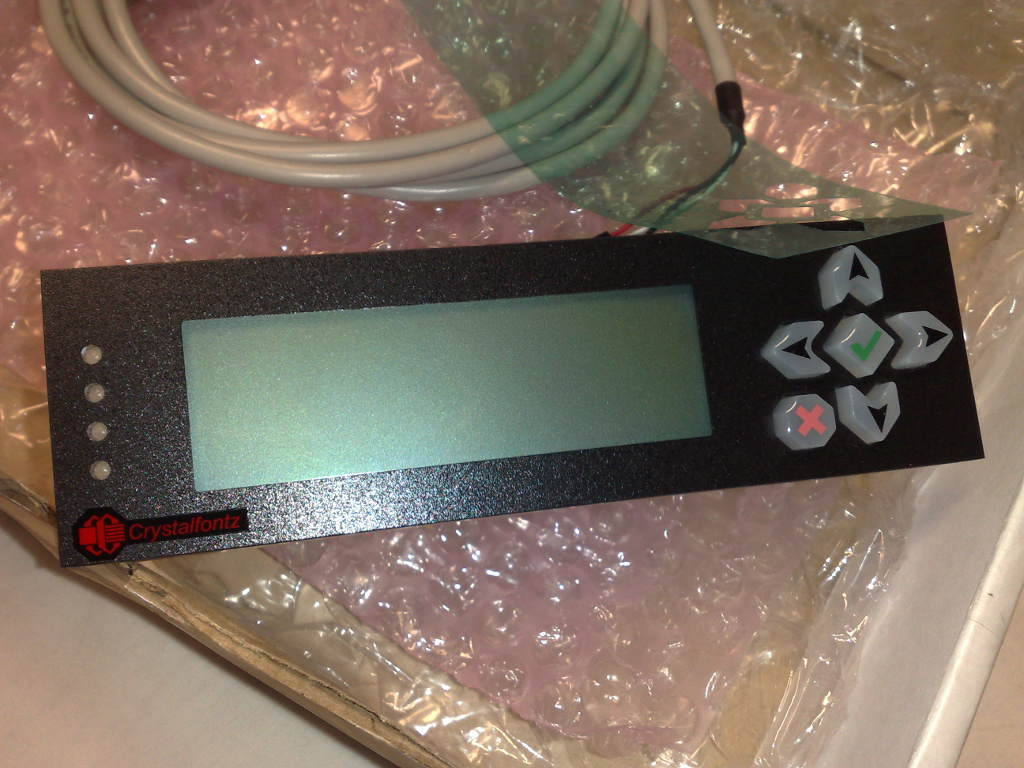
Crystalfontz CFA-635, a 5.25-inch-bay LCD (front view)

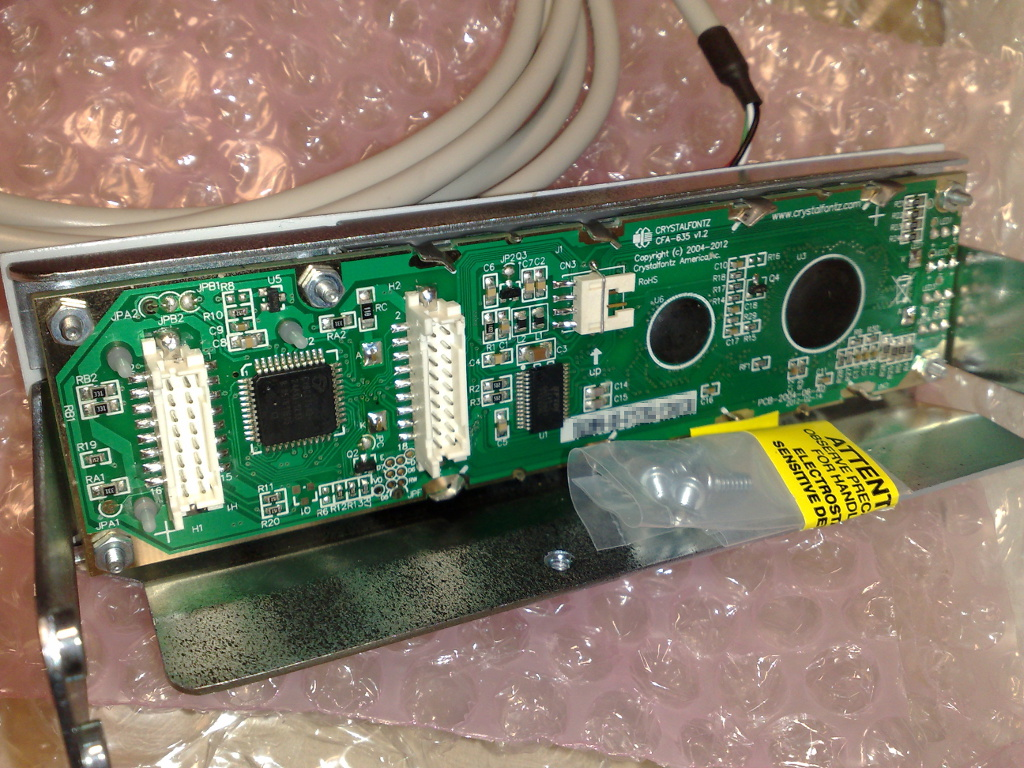
Crystalfontz CFA-635, a 5.25-inch-bay LCD (back view)

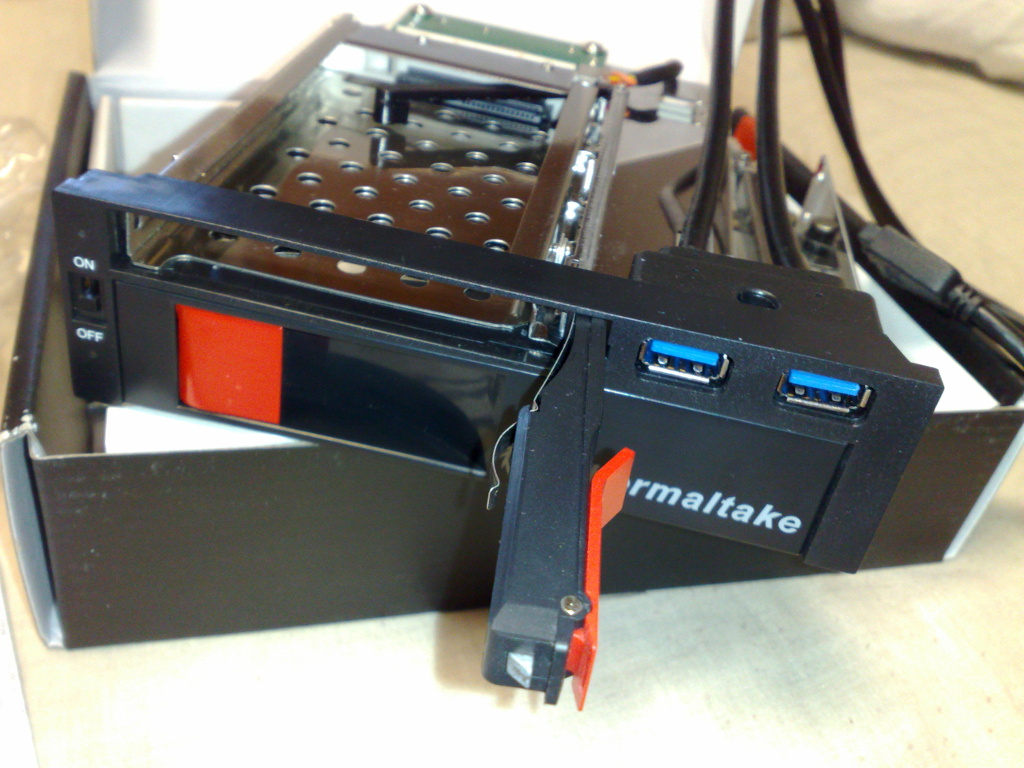
A dual-HDD rack, made as a 5.25-inch-bay device capable of simultaneously holding a 2.5-inch and a 3.5-inch SATA HDD, with two additional USB 3.0 ports

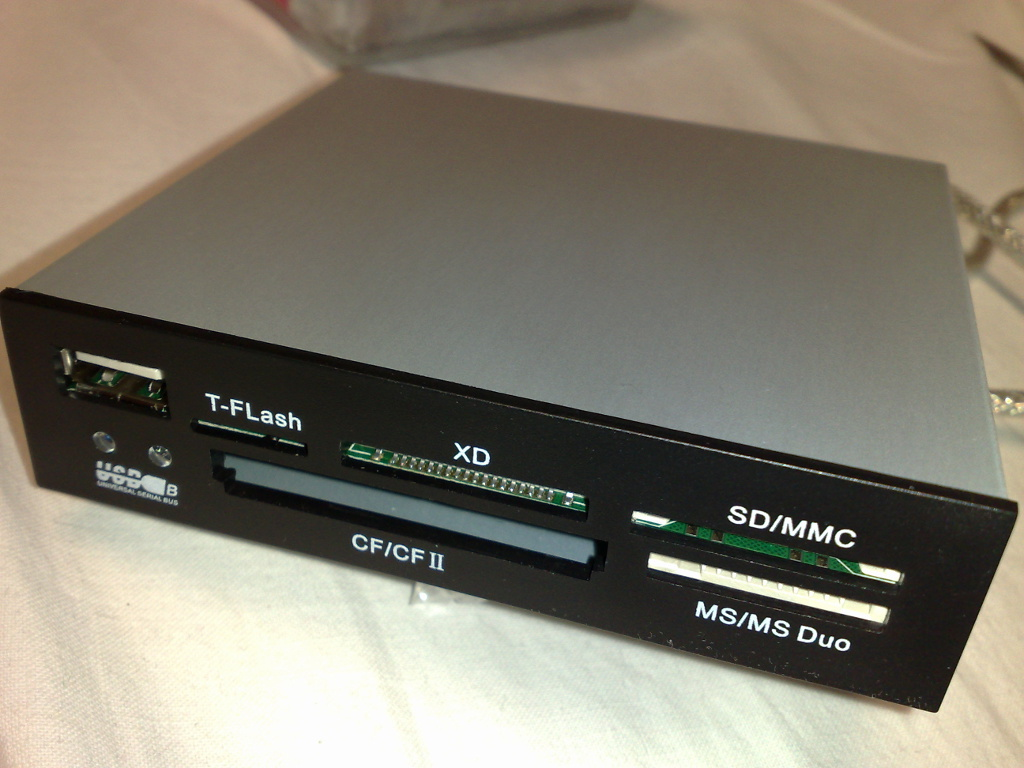
Internal memory card reader, a 3.5-inch-bay device

== See also ==
- Device Bay
- List of disk drive form factors
