= David Blech =

American businessman

David Abraham Blech (born November 25, 1955) is an American businessman, investor, and venture capitalist.

== Early life and education ==
Blech grew up in Brooklyn, New York. Blech graduated from Baruch College and earned a Master's in Music Education at the Teacher's College of Columbia University.

== Early career ==
Since 1980, Blech has founded companies and vested venture capital in the biotechnology sector. His initial venture investment, Genetic Systems Corporation, which he helped found with his father and his brother Isaac Blech, was built around promising scientists, including the high-profile microbiologist Robert Nowinski. It developed a test to diagnose sexually transmitted diseases using monoclonal antibodies. The company was sold to Bristol Myers in 1986 for $294 million (3%) of Bristol Myers stock.

In 1989, Blech co-founded Icos Corporation with Nowinski and George B. Rathmann, receiving the largest start up financing in biotech history at $33 million. Icos discovered the drug Cialis, which was acquired by Eli Lilly in 2003 for over $2.6 billion. The Blechs also co-founded Celgene Corporation in 1986, which was a unit of the Celanese Corporation, and was spun off as an independent company following the merger of Celanese Corporation with American Hoechst Corporation. As of 2012, Celgene had introduced two major cancer drugs.

Other companies he helped found include DNA Plant Technology, Neurogen Corporation, Incyte Pharmaceuticals, Alexion Pharmaceuticals, ARIAD Pharmaceuticals, Neurocrine Biosciences, Cytosorbents Inc, and Intellect Neurosciences. He was also instrumental in the turnaround of Liposome Technology Inc. and Biotech General Corporation. In 1990, Blech founded D. Blech & Company, which, until it ceased doing business in September 1994, was a registered broker-dealer involved in underwriting biotechnology issues. At his peak in 1992, Blech's wealth was estimated at almost $300 million, briefly making him a member of the Forbes 400.

Falling deep into debt, D. Blech & Co was in violation of net capital rules and ceased operations on September 22, 1994, a day that came to be known as "Blech Thursday" in the biotech industry.

Blech came under investigation by the SEC for securities fraud. During the investigation Lloyd Schwed, a Florida-based attorney representing a group of former brokers, attempted to blackmail Blech by promising to withhold tapes subpoenaed during the investigation. Blech became an informant in exchange for leniency. He pleaded guilty to two counts of criminal fraud and was sentenced to a five-year term of probation. A documentary film titled The Blech Effect was released in 2020 documenting his rise and fall in the industry.

== Personal ==
Blech says he is bipolar, has a gambling addiction and is a member of Gamblers Anonymous.
