= Intégral Peripherals =

Defunct American data storage company

Intégral Peripherals, Inc.
- Company type: Private
- Industry: Computer storage
- Founded: 1990; 36 years ago in Boulder, Colorado, United States
- Founders: Steve Volk; Jim Morehouse; John Blagaila
- Defunct: June 1998; 27 years ago
- Fate: Acquired by H&Q Asia Pacific
- Website: integralnet.com at the Wayback Machine (archived December 28, 1996)

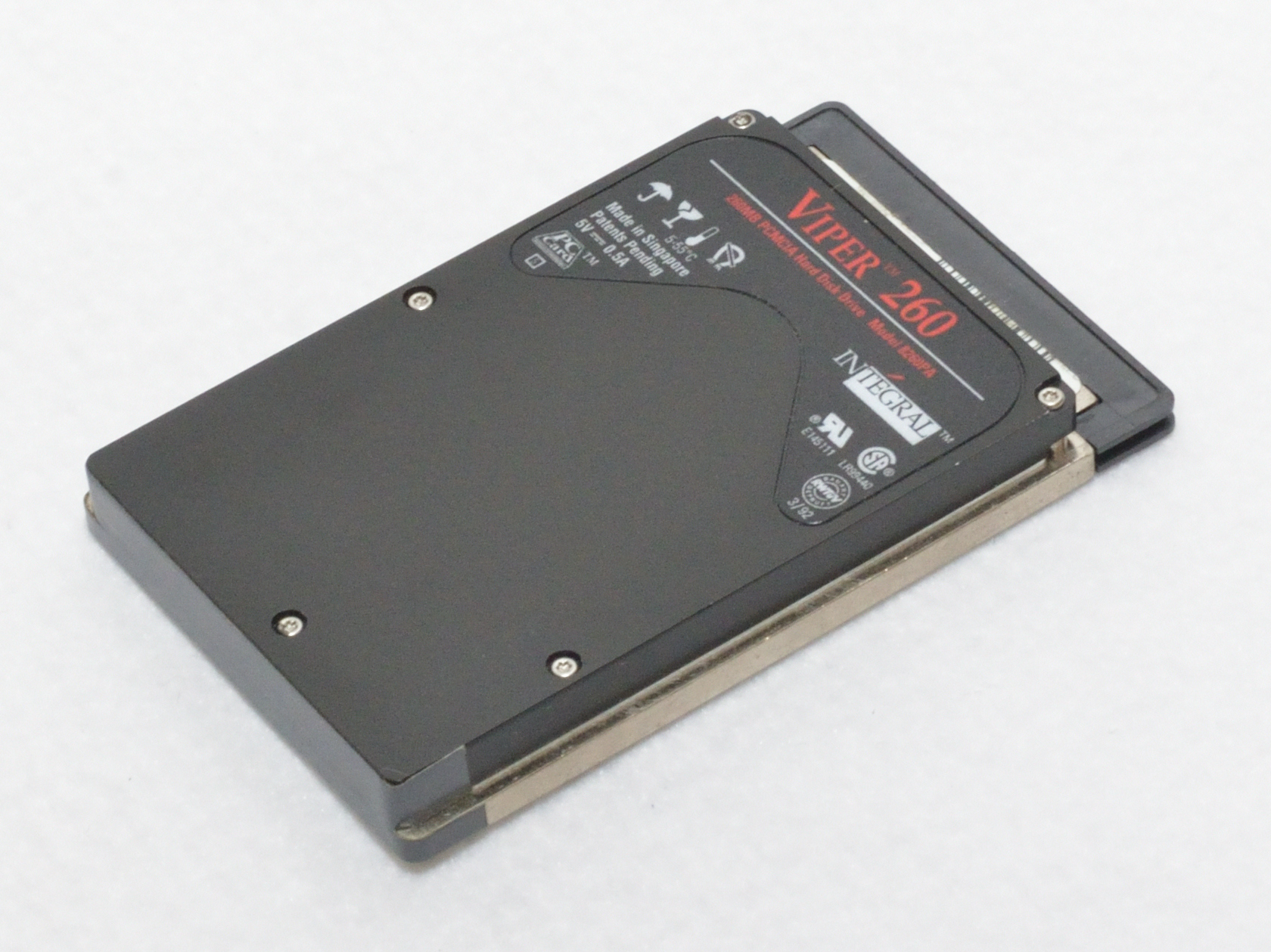
The Viper 260 is a 260 MB PC Card hard disk drive made by Integral Peripherals, designed for use in laptops and portable systems from the 1990s

Intégral Peripherals, Inc., or simply Intégral, was an American computer hardware company based in Boulder, Colorado, and active from 1990 to 1998. It was the first company to manufacture hard disk drives with a platter diameter of 1.8 inches, smaller than the typical 2.5-inch hard drives used in laptops and other mobile devices. Initially met with market skepticism, Intégral found success in the mid-1990s with design wins in products by IBM, Hewlett-Packard, and Toshiba, among others. However, its investors dropping out of the company amid the 1997 Asian financial crisis caused the company to file bankruptcy in 1998, after which it was acquired by private equity firm H&Q Asia Pacific.

== History ==
=== Foundation (1990–1991) ===
Intégral Peripherals, Inc., was founded in 1990 in Boulder, Colorado, by Steve Volk, Jim Morehouse, and John Blagaila. The three co-founders had previously worked for Longmont-based PrairieTek, which was the first company to manufacture 2.5-inch hard drives. Hard drives with platter diameters matching PrairieTek's soon saw widespread use in laptops and other mobile devices, such as handheld PCs. After leaving PrairieTek, they founded Intégral to focus on the development of even-smaller 1.8-inch hard drives. Intégral was first headquartered at a 16,000-square-foot building in Boulder that served as its administrative headquarters and as a limited manufacturing facility, able to produce up to several thousand drives per month for the sake of small batches and production samples. The company initially sought to contract mass manufacturing to an offshore factory Singapore, with groundbreaking to commence some time in 1991. Intégral's initial start-up capital came entirely from East Asian countries, including three computer systems manufacturers, six hardware vendors, and one distributor, all of whom pitched in US$7 million in 1990.

=== Market introduction (1991–1993) ===
Intégral shipped out the first production samples of their 20-MB Mustang 1820 in August 1991. By September 1991, construction of the Singapore factory still had not commenced, and its Boulder facility could only produce up to 4,000 drives per month, well below expected projections. Scrambling to find a suitable production partner before competitors encroached on its market, in late December 1991 the company raised an additional $15.5 million in capital and signed a contract with Fuji Electric for the latter to produce Intégral's drives in Singapore. By February 1992, Fuji was producing the Mustang 1820 in bulk, and in March 1992 they began producing Integral's Stingray 1842, a 40-MB, dual-platter, 1.8-inch drive.

By September 1992, Intégral employed 50 people at their Boulder headquarters. The following month, the company announced that they had signed a cross-licensing deal with Quantum Corporation, in which both companies licensed patents from the other in order to diversify their product rosters. Despite decent standalone sales of their hard drives, Integral by this point had yet to score a design win in a prebuilt computer system beyond one Japanese pen tablet computer, the Toshiba Dynanote.

In early 1993, they released their first PC Card hard drives. These drives adopted the same 1.8-inch form factor of their standalone drives but featured a PC Card socket on the end. Around this time, many laptops began carrying PC Card slots internally. Intégral's first drives in this range consisted of the Ranger 1841P and the Cobra 1882P, with a capacity of 40 MB and 85 MB respectively. Intégral engineered the drives to withstand an operating shock rating of 100 g.

Intégral was in 1993 the market leader in the 1.8-inch drive segment, shipping a majority of the 150,000 drives sold that year. Its competitors then included MiniStor Peripherals (who earlier in 1992 were the first to ship PC Card hard drives), Aura Associates, Western Digital, and Maxtor. Sales improved as the laptop industry began adopting the PC Card standard en masse, and in November 1993 the company doubled its Singaporean workforce from 29 workers to 56 and saw its monthly production increase twofold as well, from 10,000 drives to 20,000 drives. In 1994, Intégral again dominated the 1.8-inch drive market, which saw disappointing sales that year, shipping only between 250,000 and 500,000 units, compared to the projected 3.5 million.

=== Success (1994–1997) ===
Intégral's 420-MB Cobalt 420 PC Card drive, introduced in October 1994 alongside their mainstream Viper line of PC Card drives, was the first hard drive to feature a multi-chip module IC, necessitated due to its small stature combined with a three-platter, six-head drive assembly. Around this time, Intégral's drives gained broader acceptance among computer systems builders, scoring design wins with Hewlett-Packard for the latter's HP OmniBook subnotebook, with IBM for their ThinkPad notebooks, and with Toshiba and Fujitsu for their pen tablets.

By April 1995, MiniStor had gone bankrupt and Maxtor had exited the field of 1.8-inch drives entirely, leaving Intégral and Calluna Technology as the only remaining makers of 1.8-inch drives. Despite cornering 68 percent of the market for 1.8-inch drives, Intégral themselves admitted partial defeat by entering the market for 2.5-inch hard drives in May 1995 with the Platinum line. Helped along by their experience manufacturing 1.8-inch drives, their premier entry in the 2.5-inch drive market, the Platinum/1010, was one of the first 1-GB 2.5-inch drives and the thinnest 1-GB drive available at the time. Revenues in the company increased sharply in 1995, to $69 million from $15 million in 1994. By April 1996, Intégral employed 140 workers in the United States and 300 workers globally.

=== Decline (1997–1998) ===
The company was hit hard in 1997 by the concurrent Asian financial crisis causing investors to drop out of Intégral. In early 1998 the company discontinued their flagship 1.8-inch drives, leaving Calluna as the sole contender in that market. Intégral filed for Chapter 11 bankruptcy in March 1998, with $3.5 million in assets and roughly $25 million in liabilities. They were sold to Mobile Storage—a unit of H&Q Asia Pacific, a private equity firm—for $5.5 million in assets and $1.7 million in license revenues the following June.

After leaving Intégral, Volk went on to found DataPlay, a maker of very small (32 mm diameter) optical discs, in Longmont.
