= List of disk drive form factors =

Since the invention of the floppy disk drive, various standardized form factors have been used in computing systems. Standardized form factors and interface allow a variety of peripherals and upgrades thereto with no impact to the physical size of a computer system. Drives may slot into a drive bay of the corresponding size.

The disk drive size, such as 3.5-inch, usually refers to the diameter of the disk platters.

== List ==
Past and present HDD form factors
Form factor (inch)	Status	Dimensions			Largest capacity	Platters (max.)	Capacity per platter (GB)
Form factor (inch)	Status	Length	Width	Height	Largest capacity	Platters (max.)	Capacity per platter (GB)
3.5	Current	5.75 inch (146.05 mm)	4.0 inch (101.6 mm)	18.28 mm, 26.11 mm or 19.99 mm	36 TB (January 2025)	11 (October 2024)	3,200
2.5	Current	4.0 inch (101.6 mm)	2.75 inch (69.85 mm)	5 mm, 7 mm (Note: Commons on personal SSDs), 9.5 mm, (Note: Commons on two platters hard disks) 12.5 mm, 15 mm or 19 mm	6 TB (May 2024)	6	1,000
1.8	Obsolete	78.5 mm, (Note: This dimension includes a 0.5 mm protrusion of the Micro SATA connector from the device body.) 71 mm (Note: Measured on Toshiba MK1011GAH)	54 mm	5 mm or 8 mm	320 GB (2009)	2	220
1.3	Obsolete	50.8 mm, 43 mm	36.5 mm	10.5 mm, 5.3 mm	40 GB(2007)	1	40
1 (CFII/ZIF/IDE-Flex, "Microdrive")	Obsolete	42.8 mm	36.4 mm	5 mm	12 GB (2006)	1	12
0.85	Obsolete	32 mm	24 mm	5 mm	8 GB (2004)	1	8
5.25 (HH)	Obsolete	8.0 inch (203.2 mm)	5.75 inch (146.05 mm)	1.625 inch (41.275 mm)	19.3 GB (1998)	4 (Note: The Quantum Bigfoot TS used a maximum of three platters, other earlier and lower capacity product used up to four platters in a 5.25-inch HH form factor, e.g., Microscience HH1090 circa 1989.)	4.83
5.25 (FH)	Obsolete	8.0 inch (203.2 mm)	5.75 inch (146.05 mm)	3.25 inch (82.55 mm)	47 GB (1998)	14	3.36
8	Obsolete	14.5 inch (368.3 mm)	9.5 inch (241.3 mm)	4.625 inch (117.475 mm)	2.0 GB (1989)	Unknown (at least 12)	Unknown (at least 0.16̅)

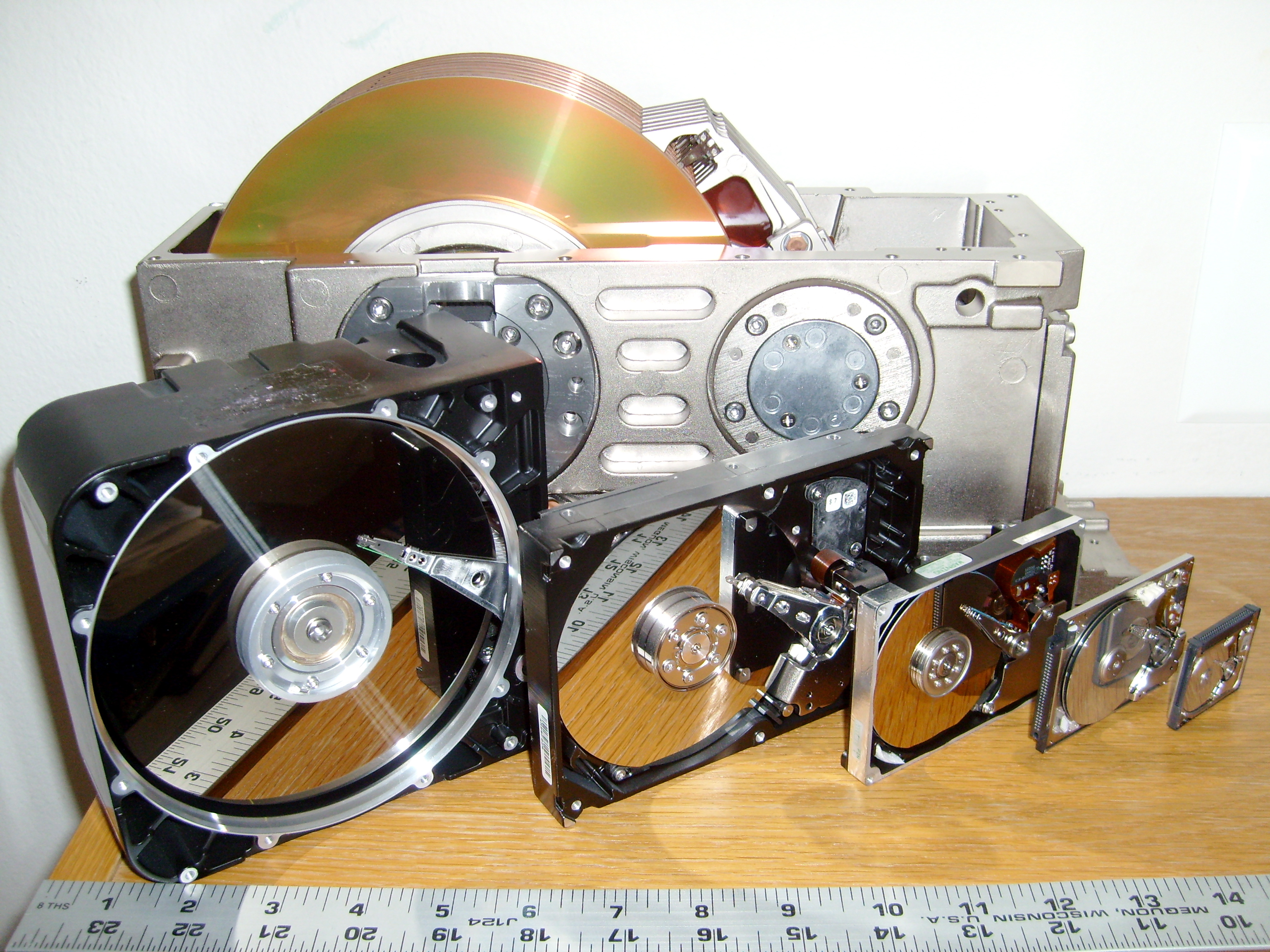
8-, 5.25-, 3.5-, 2.5-, 1.8- and 1-inch HDDs, together with a ruler to show the length of platters and read-write heads

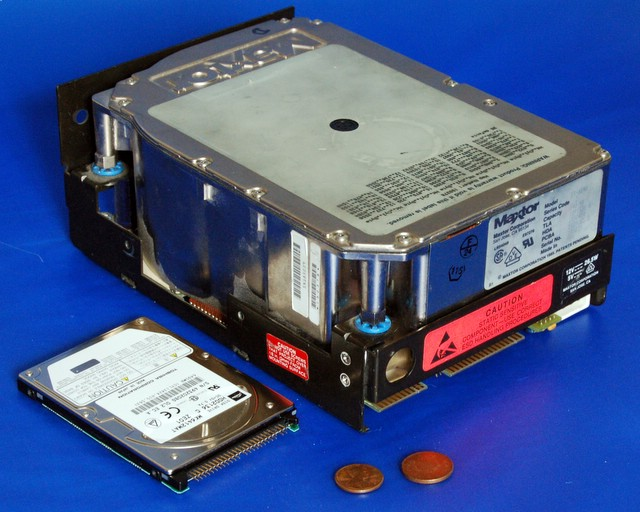
A newer 2.5-inch (63.5 mm) 6,495 MB HDD compared to an older 5.25-inch full-height 110 MB HDD

IBM's first hard drive, the IBM 350, used a stack of fifty 24-inch platters and was of a size comparable to two large refrigerators. In 1962, IBM introduced its model 1311 disk, which used six 14-inch (nominal size) platters in a removable pack and was roughly the size of a washing machine. This became a standard platter size and drive form-factor for many years, used also by other manufacturers. The IBM 2314 used platters of the same size in an eleven-high pack and introduced the "drive in a drawer" layout, although the "drawer" was not the complete drive.

Later drives were designed to fit entirely into a chassis that would mount in a 19-inch rack. Digital's RK05 and RL01 were early examples using single 14-inch platters in removable packs, the entire drive fitting in a 10.5-inch-high rack space (six rack units). In the mid-to-late 1980s the similarly sized Fujitsu Eagle, which used (coincidentally) 10.5-inch platters, was a popular product.

Such large platters were never used with microprocessor-based systems. With increasing sales of microcomputers having built in floppy-disk drives (FDDs), HDDs that would fit to the FDD mountings became desirable. Thus HDD Form factors, initially followed those of 8-inch, 5.25-inch, and 3.5-inch floppy disk drives. Because there were no smaller floppy disk drives, smaller HDD form factors developed from product offerings or industry standards.

=== 8-inch ===
9.5 in × 4.624 in × 14.25 in (241.3 mm × 117.5 mm × 362 mm). In 1979, Shugart Associates' SA1000 was the first form factor compatible HDD, having the same dimensions and a compatible interface to the 8" FDD.

=== 5.25-inch ===
5.75 in × 3.25 in × 8 in (146.1 mm × 82.55 mm × 203 mm). This smaller form factor, first used in an HDD by Seagate in 1980, was the same size as full-height 5 1/4-inch-diameter (130 mm) FDD, 3.25-inches high. This is twice as high as "half height"; i.e., 1.63 in (41.4 mm). Most desktop models of drives for optical 120 mm disks (DVD, CD) use the half height 5¼" dimension, but it fell out of fashion for HDDs. The format was standardized as EIA-741 and co-published as SFF-8501 for disk drives, with other SFF-85xx series standards covering related 5.25 inch devices (optical drives, etc.) The Quantum Bigfoot HDD was the last to use it in the late 1990s, with "low-profile" (≈25 mm) and "ultra-low-profile" (≈20 mm) high versions.

=== 3.5-inch ===
4 in × 1 in × 5 3/4 in (102 mm × 25 mm × 146 mm) = 377 cm^{3}. This smaller form factor is similar to that used in an HDD by Rodime in 1983, which was the same size as the "half height" 3 1/2 in (89 mm) FDD, i.e., 1.63 inches (41 mm) high. Today, the 1-inch high ("one-third height", "slimline", or "low-profile") version of this form factor is the most popular form used in most desktops and data centers. The format was standardized in terms of dimensions and positions of mounting holes as EIA/ECA-740, co-published as SFF-8301. SFF-8301 includes drive heights of 17.80, 26.10, and 42.00mm, but as of 2025, no drives are produced in 42mm height. Drives with heights not mentioned in SFF-8301 are manufactured, e.g. Seagate 19.99-mm-high drives and a Samsung low-profile single-disc drive with a height of 18.288 millimetres (0.72 in).

=== 2.5-inch ===
2.75 in × 0.197–0.75 in × 3.945 in (69.85 mm × 5–19 mm × 100 mm) = 34.925–132.715 cm^{3}. This smaller form factor was introduced by PrairieTek in 1988; there is no corresponding FDD. The 2.5-inch drive format is standardized in the EIA/ECA-720 co-published as SFF-8201; when used with specific connectors, more detailed specifications are SFF-8212 for the 50-pin (ATA laptop) connector, SFF-8223 with the SATA, or SAS connector and SFF-8222 with the SCA-2 connector.

It came to be widely used for HDDs in mobile devices (laptops, music players, etc.) and for solid-state drives (SSDs), by 2008 replacing some 3.5 inch enterprise-class drives. It is also used in the PlayStation 3 and Xbox 360 video game consoles.

Drives 9.5 mm high became an unofficial standard for all except the largest-capacity laptop drives (usually having two platters inside); 12.5 mm-high drives, typically with three platters, are used for maximum capacity, but will not fit most laptop computers. Enterprise-class drives can have a height up to 15 mm. Seagate released a 7 mm drive aimed at entry level laptops and high end netbooks in December 2009. Western Digital released on April 23, 2013 a hard drive 5 mm in height specifically aimed at Ultrabooks.

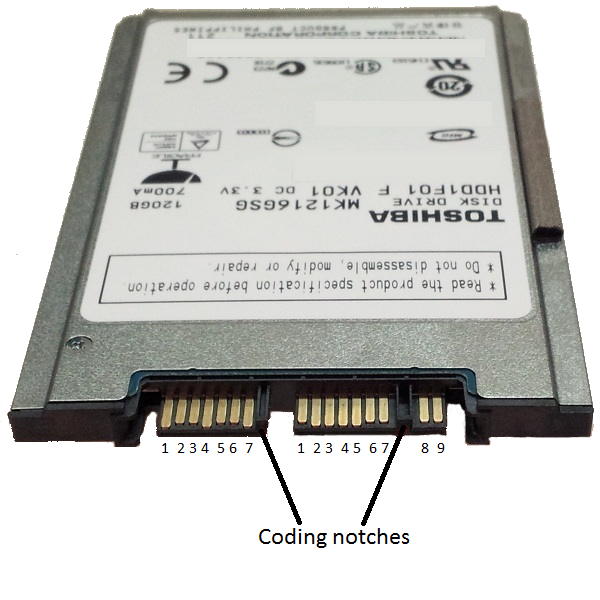
Toshiba MK1216GSG 1.8" 120 GB hard disk drive with Micro SATA

=== 1.8-inch ===
54 mm × 8 mm × 78.5 mm = 33.912 cm^{3}. This form factor, originally introduced by Intégral Peripherals in 1991, evolved into the ATA-7 ZIF with dimensions as stated but with a total length of 71mm. Later, the micro-SATA interface made the total length 78.5mm.

1.8-inch drives with ZIF connectors were used in digital audio players, such as the iPod Classic, and subnotebooks. Later 1.8-inch drives were updated with a micro-SATA connector and up to 320GB of storage (Toshiba MK3233GSG). The 1.8-inch form factor was eventually phased out as SSDs became cheaper and more compact. There was an attempt to standardize this format as SFF-8123, but it was cancelled in 2005. SATA revision 2.6 standardized the internal Micro SATA connector and device dimensions.

=== 1.3-inch ===
51 mm × 43.8 mm × 10.5 mm. This form factor was used by HP C3013A, C3013B and C3014A, named HP Kittyhawk microdrive, introduced in June 1992.

=== 1-inch ===
42.8 mm × 5 mm × 36.4 mm. This form factor was introduced in 1999, as IBM's Microdrive to fit inside a CF Type II slot. Samsung calls the same form factor "1.3 inch" drive in its product literature.

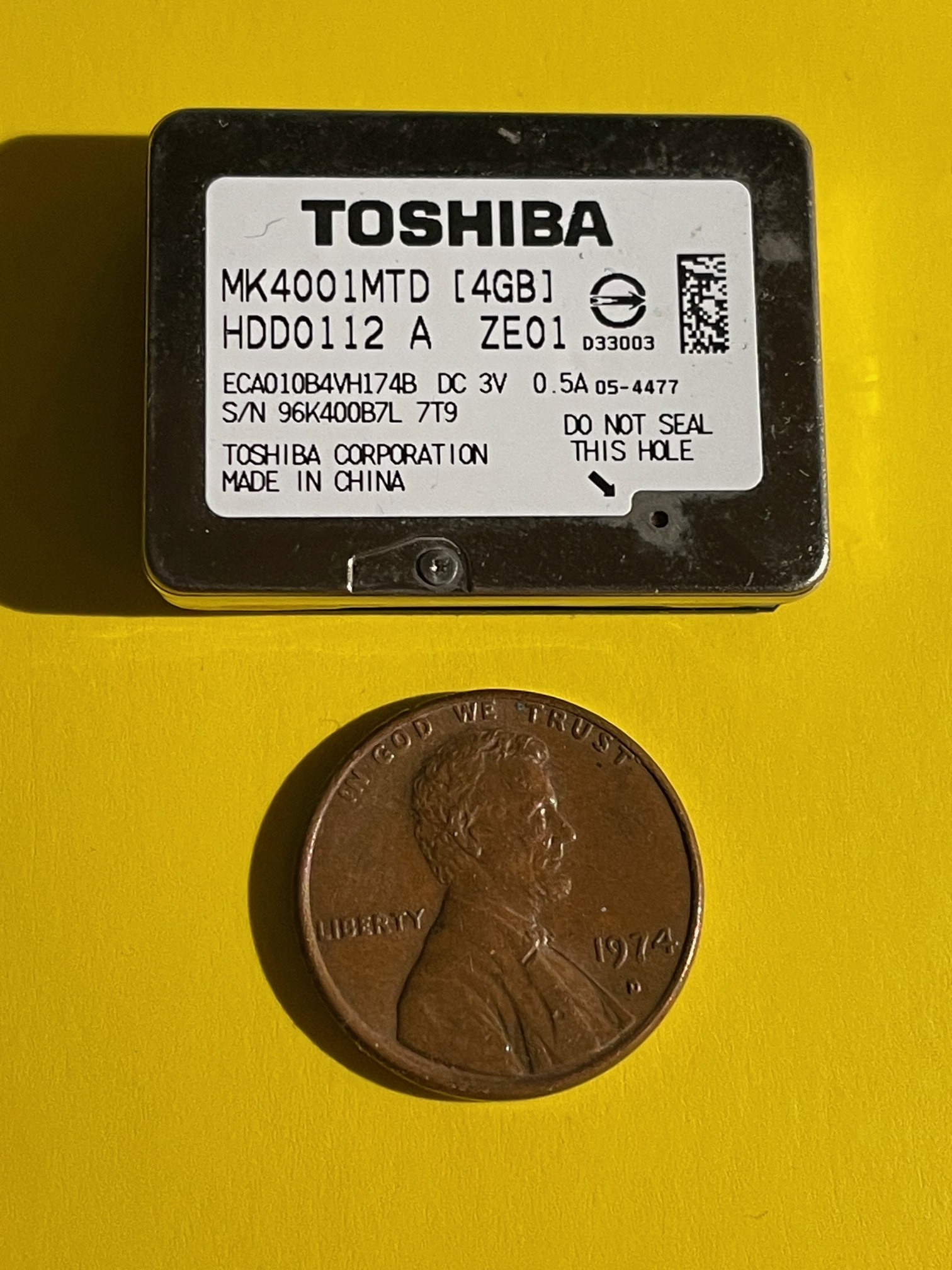
Toshiba MK4001MTD 0.85" 4 GB drive

=== 0.85-inch ===
24 mm × 5 mm × 32 mm. Toshiba announced this form factor in January 2004 for use in mobile phones and similar applications, including SD/MMC slot compatible HDDs optimized for video storage on 4G handsets. Toshiba manufactured a 4 GB (MK4001MTD) and an 8 GB (MK8003MTD) version and holds the Guinness World Record for the smallest HDD.

=== Modern usage ===
As of 2025, 2.5-inch and 3.5-inch hard disks are the most popular sizes. With 3.5-inch drives making slightly more than half of today’s shipments, it is estimated that by 2030 70% of all HDD shipments will be 3.5-inch drives, due to the declining presence of 2.5-inch in portable devices due to the adoption of SSDs.

By 2009, all manufacturers had discontinued the development of new products for the 1.8-inch, 1.3-inch, 1-inch and 0.85-inch form factors due to falling prices of flash memory, which has no moving parts. The 5.25-inch form factor died out in the late 1990s as 3.5-inch drives became the dominant form factor due to increasing areal density. 2.5-inch drives are currently declining in terms of total shipments due to thinner laptops not usually having an HDD bay at all and 3.5-inch drives especially nearline data center ones are increasing in shipments and percentage sold driven by the rise of AI and cloud storage, as well as their place in desktop computers today.

While these form factors are customarily described by an approximately correct figure in inches, actual sizes have long been specified in millimeters. The older 3.5-inch form factor uses UNC threads, while 2.5-inch drives use metric M3 threads.
