= The Blech Effect =

2020 American documentary film

- Film poster
- Directed by: David Greenwald
- Produced by: David Cowan, Debra Polkes
- Edited by: David Greenwald & Edmund Carson
- Music by: Anton Sanko
- Distributed by: Virgil Films
- Release date: August 25, 2020
- Running time: 87 minutes
- Country: United States
- Language: English

The Blech Effect is a 2020 documentary film directed by David Greenwald, following former "King of Biotech" David Blech. In his early 20s, Blech was a pioneer investor in biotech companies such as Celgene, Alexion Pharmaceuticals, cancer drug developer Ariad Pharmaceuticals, and Icos, which developed the impotence drug Cialis. Blech's wealth grew with the industry and he was once worth more than 300 million dollars, securing his place on the Forbes 400 list. He became known as the King of Biotech and his influence on the market coined the term "The Blech Effect".

The film released on August 25, 2020, to digital streaming services.

== Reception ==
Richard Whittaker from the Austin Chronicle reviewed the film and gave it 3 out of 5 stars

Alex Saveliev from Film Threat gave the film an 8 out of 10, saying "its powerful effect cannot be underestimated".
