= Cytokine adsorbing column =

Remove inflammatory toxins from the body

Cytokine-adsorbing columns remove inflammatory toxins from the body. Such technology is currently being studied in more than 53 countries, including to treat sepsis in the European Union. Specific products include the brand names Cytosorb by Cytosorbents, Lixelle among others.

Their use is currently experimental; early clinical trials have generally failed to show significant improvement in survival.

Using cytokine-adsorbing columns involves channeling the patient's blood through a cartridge containing millions of minuscule polymer beads which trap toxins and inflammatory proteins. For this reason, the technology can only be used in conjunction with an additional blood pump system, like a dialysis machine or a heart-lung machine.

When cytokine-adsorbing columns are used in patients with septic shock, their additional clearance of antibiotics and antifungals should be taken into account, in order to increase their dose, especially when lipophilic anti-infective agents are administered.

The US Air Force is funding a $3 million FDA approved randomized controlled trial in trauma and rhabdomyolysis.
