= Device Bay =

Device Bay was a standard jointly developed by Compaq, Intel and Microsoft in 1997, as a simple way to add, remove, and share hardware devices. Originally intended to be introduced in the second half of 1998, Device Bay was never finalized and has long since been abandoned. The official website disappeared in mid-2001.

Making use of new technologies at the time, such as USB and FireWire, Device Bay was intended to make adding and removing devices from the PC easier, through the use of plug-n-play. It allowed peripherals such as hard drives, CD/DVD-ROM drives, audio devices, and modems, to be added to the PC without having to open the case or even turn the PC off. Devices could also be removed from the PC while it was still turned on; this could also be done through software in the operating system. Another advantage of Device Bay was that it allowed certain devices to be swapped between a desktop and laptop computer.

HP released a line on PCs that uses the idea of device bay to expand the personal storage on a personal computer and marketed them as "HP Personal Media Drives". These Drives/Bays are primarily available on the HP Media Center PCs.
