= Cytosorbents Corporation =

American medical technology company

CytoSorbents Corporation
- Company type: Public
- Traded as: Nasdaq: CTSO; Russell 2000 Component
- Industry: Critical care
- Headquarters: Princeton, New Jersey, US
- Products: CytoSorb
- Revenue: US$ 41.0 Mio. (2020)
- Number of employees: 160
- Website: cytosorbents.com

CytoSorbents Corporation is a publicly traded company located in Princeton, New Jersey.

CytoSorbents sells a cytokine adsorbing column ("CytoSorb" which received CE mark approval in 2011) — a blood purification technology based on porous polymer beads that act like sponges in an attempt to remove harmful inflammatory mediators like Cytokines, Bilirubin, Myoglobin from the blood.

The use of hemoperfusion columns is generally limited to patients who are critically ill in high-resource counties, and they require a patient to be connected to a hemofiltration system such as Dialysis, Hemofiltration Cardiopulmonary bypass or ECMO. Other blood purification devices are using different technologies with different performance parameters. This is including polymyxin B hemoperfusion columns (Toraymyxin), which failed to show significance in a clinical trial for sepsis. The CytoSorb technology has actually the largest body of clinical data confirming safety and efficacy. Clinicaltrials.gov is giving an overview over running research projects.

CytoSorbents was awarded a $3.8 million contract by Defense Advanced Research Projects Agency (DARPA) for its “Dialysis-Like Therapeutics” program to treat sepsis by removing cytokines and pathogen-derived toxins. The US Army awarded the Company a $1.15 million small-business innovation research contract to evaluate the technology in burn and trauma.
