= WZGM =

Simulcasting WBRM Marion
- Black Mountain, North Carolina; United States
- Broadcast area: Asheville, North Carolina
- Frequency: 1350 kHz
- Branding: Bigfoot Country 96.1 & 103.9

Programming
- Format: Classic country
- Affiliations: SRN News

Ownership
- Owner: HRN Broadcasting, Inc.

History
- First air date: February 26, 1966; 60 years ago (as WBMS)
- Former call signs: WBMS (1966–1990); WAVJ (1990–1993); WZQR (1993–1997); WTZK (1997–2002); WWRN (2002–2004); WZNN (2004–2006)

Technical information
- Licensing authority: FCC
- Facility ID: 40654
- Class: D
- Power: 10,000 watts day 56 watts night
- Translator: 96.1 W241DD (Asheville)

Links
- Public license information: Public file; LMS
- Webcast: Listen Live
- Website: bigfoot1039.com

WZGM (1350 AM, "Bigfoot Country 96.1 & 103.9") is a radio station broadcasting a classic country format, simulcasting WBRM 1250 AM Marion. WZGM is licensed to Black Mountain, North Carolina, United States.

== History ==
Call letters used by this station have included WBMS and WAVJ. WWRN was the first sports talk station in Asheville. WWRN was purchased in August 2004 by Rick and Beth Howerton under their 'Zybek Media Group' moniker and they changed the call letters to WZNN. The new all-talk station was now known as "Super Talk 1350" after a daytime signal boost to 10,000 watts, and aired Neal Boortz, Sean Hannity, Bill O'Reilly, Michael Reagan, Mike Gallagher and Laura Ingraham. The station switched to sports early in 2006 and to oldies in 2007. The switch to the Southern Gospel format came late in 2008.

As of March 19, 2012 WZGM was being operated under a lease contract by News Talk 50, Inc., owned by Matt Mittan. The transitional programming at that time was: News Hour (11:00am–12:00pm), Dennis Miller (syndicated, 12:00pm–3:00pm), Take A Stand (Mittan's own program originated at WZGM and was syndicated across the state of NC, Jason Lewis (syndicated, 6:00pm–9:00pm), Neal Boortz (syndicated) airs 9:00pm–12:00am, Overnight with Jon Grayson (syndicated, 1:00am–6:00am). On April 15, 2012, the station launched a new logo along with a new slogan, "AM 1350 WZGM - Your Independent Talk Alternative". As of now, the station has strong community content, in the form of grass roots driven shows. Since the start of April 2012. The transition of the station has made a lot of press in the region and even some coverage on industry publications such as Talkers Magazine. In 2014, the format of the station moved away from political talk and focused solely on community talk and sports programming, with religious programming on Sunday mornings. Matt Mittan relaunched a new afternoon program at the end of 2014 called "Right Now! with Matt Mittan" which aired live Mon-Thur 4-6pm on WZGM.

Former logo

In February 2015, Lanny Ford, general manager of WZGV and NFL executive Marty Hurney announced they were leasing WZGV and WZGM from HRN. Hurney had worked for WZGV since June 2014. Ford also said some WZGV programs would air on WZGM, which has added some sports-related programs and also broadcasts Appalachian State University sports.

Matt Mittan, as well as numerous local community hosts, continued to broadcast on the station daily under Mittan's company, NewsTalk 50, Inc, providing local and regional discussions covering news of western North Carolina. NewsTalk 50, Inc has grown to produce and distribute digital and radio programming for AM and FM stations across the state of NC as well, not just on WZGM. On September 21, 2020, The King's Radio Network added WZGM as a 'sister station' in the company's religious format radio stations.

In March 2023, WZGM announced plans to change to a mix of classic country music and Black Mountain community news and information as "96.1 the Bear".

On April 9, 2025, WZGM switched to a simulcast of WBRM 1250 AM Marion, branded as "Bigfoot Country 96.1 & 103.9".
