= Big Foot (album) =

Studio album by Melinda Sullivan and Larry Goldings
- Released: August 2024
- Studios: Lucy's Meat Market, Los Angeles
- Genre: Jazz
- Label: Colorfield Records
- Producers: Pete Min; Larry Goldings; Melinda Sullivan

Big Foot is a studio album by the American dancer Melinda Sullivan and musician and composer Larry Goldings. Released in August 2024, the recording features original compositions largely by the duo, with Goldings on keyboard and a variety of synthesizers, while Sullivan's tap dancing provides the percussion.

== Background and recording ==
Goldings first met Sullivan in 2019 when Inara George brought her in as a guest artist to help workshop a musical. They later collaborated in the COVID era on a rendition of "Somewhere" for Sullivan's father-in-law, continuing their work in Goldings' studio and backyard. Goldings credited Sullivan with "having all the skills of a great jazz instrumentalist", including the ability to listen, improvise, and go with the flow.

They dropped videos of their work online and in 2023, performed live in California and Southwest venues. Journalist Allen Morrison wrote that "the duo is, in practice and effect, more like a trio: Golding's right hand on piano, his left hand on walking synth base and Sullivan's stunningly adroit percussion riffs."

Transforming the live act into a comparable recording took several sessions. "I wanted people to hear what Melinda does", Goldman said. Sullivan retained the wooden tap board she used for live sessions, but instead of tap shoes, she mostly danced in sneakers, sand and socks. Leo Sidran wrote that "the toe, heel, slide and taps that she coaxes in socks are surprisingly complex, sometimes evoking brushes on a snare drum, other times tablas or frame drums, and still other times the sound of an analog drum machine or beat box."

Also performing on Big Foot are Sam Gendel (saxophone), CJ Camerieri (trumpet), Daphne Chen (violin and viola) and Karl McComas-Reichl (bass). Goldings' daughter Anna sings on the track "Do You Like," which also includes drummer Steve Gadd, who taps with his hands on a cardboard box.

== Reception ==
In DownBeat, Josef Woodard wrote that "part of Big Foot's ample charm relates to its means of sonic production. We recognize the layered electronic textures in keyboardist Larry Goldings' melodic and harmonic conjuring, but the music's percussive intricacies and filigrees can be harder to tap into, so to speak. Welcome to the world of tap dancer Melinda Sullivan, whose nimble footwork interacts with Goldings' attractive post-fusion tapestries in a free, ear-opening way."

Writing on All About Jazz, Sidran likened Big Foot to a film soundtrack "that has yet to be discovered—perhaps a futuristic romantic comedy sci-fi heist that was never made. The songs play like film cues in part because of their unraveling structure. They begin, they develop, they end somewhere unexpected....But whatever the journey and the influences ma.y have been, simply put Big Foot is great music that is both extremely difficult to execute but very easy to listen to."

On the website Jazzwise, where Big Foot was an editor's choice, Kevin Le Gendre said to "take the title literally. Big Foot is an album of big ideas made by the foot, and other things. Tap dancer Melinda Sullivan provides rhythms through steps that are so ingeniously miked by Pete Min that the uninformed ear would think a drum kit of sorts was deployed. The metallic clicking associated with the tradition of 'hoofers' is thus replaced by a wide range of percussive timbres that lends to the music a fresh electro-crunch character."

On UK Jazz News, Liam Noble wrote that "dance presents itself as a very visual medium, but in Melinda Sullivan's case she has the melodic and rhythmic brain of a drummer. In other words, it is music, and taking away the spectacle gives her melodies space to move. Focusing on that enables Goldings to spreads a wide sonic blanket without getting in the way."

== Track listing ==
No.	Title	Music	Length
1.	"Bloom"	Goldings, Sullivan	4:18
2.	"Sin Zapatos"	Goldings, Sullivan, CJ Camerieri, Daphne Chen	3:10
3.	"Do You Like"	Goldings, Sullivan, Steve Gadd, Anna Goldings	2:53
4.	"Clear Day"	Goldings, Sullivan, Sam Gendel	4:19
5.	"Ma Belle"	Goldings, Sullivan	0:58
6.	"Big Foot"	Goldings, Sullivan, Chen	3:26
7.	"Twins"	Goldings, Sullivan, Gadd, Camerieri, Karl McComas-Reich	2:50
8.	"Mother Time"	Goldings, Sullivan, McComas-Reichl	3:14
9.	"Loose Caboose"	Goldings, Sullivan, Gendel, McComas-Reichl	1:25
10.	"Quantize Me"	Goldings, Sullivan, Gendel, Camerieri	3:13
11.	"Dyad"	Sullivan, Gadd	2:19
