= WBRM =

- Marion, North Carolina; United States
- Frequency: 1250 kHz
- Branding: Bigfoot Country 96.1 & 103.9

Programming
- Format: Country/Classic country
- Affiliations: SRN News

Ownership
- Owner: William Blevins; (Signal Hill Media Partners, LLC)

History
- First air date: May 9, 1949

Technical information
- Licensing authority: FCC
- Facility ID: 71233
- Class: D
- Power: 5,000 watts day 51 watts night
- Transmitter coordinates: 35°40′59.00″N 82°2′8.00″W
- Translator: 103.9 W280FP (Marion)
- Repeater: 1350 WZGM (Black Mountain)

Links
- Public license information: Public file; LMS
- Webcast: Listen Live
- Website: bigfoot1039.com

WBRM (1250 AM) is a radio station broadcasting a country/classic country music format. Licensed to Marion, North Carolina, United States, the station is currently owned by William Blevins and Signal Hill Media Partners, LLC.

In September 2023 WBRM changed their format from country to classic country, branded as "Bigfoot Country 103.9".

In April 2025, WBRM began simulcasting on WZGM 1350 AM Black Mountain, rebranding as "Bigfoot Country 96.1 & 103.9".
