= Melinda Sullivan =

American dancer, choreographer and actress

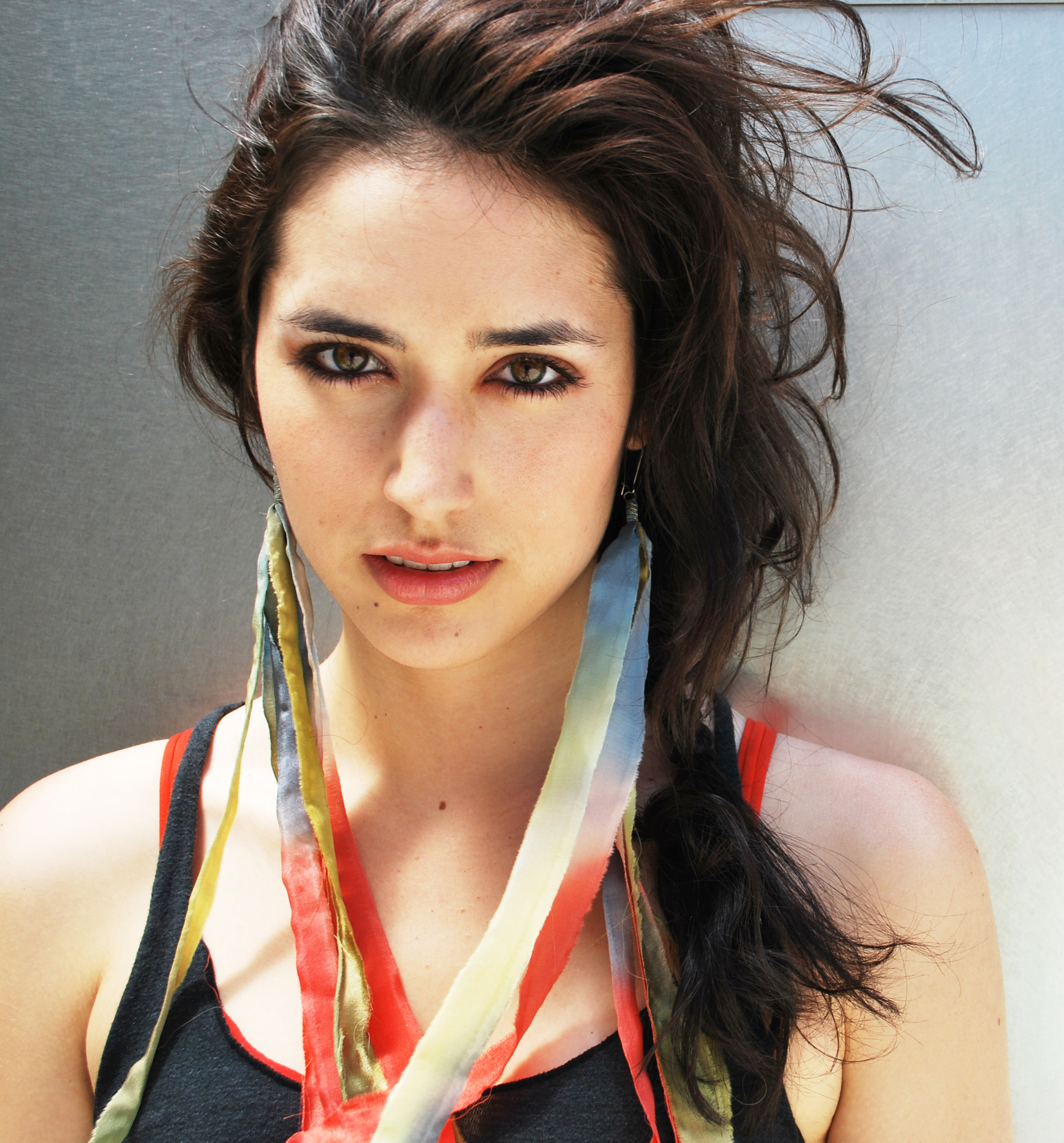
- Born: Melinda Loretta Sullivan; September 30, 1987 (age 38); East Meadow, New York, U.S.
- Occupation(s): Choreographer, dancer, actress
- Website: www.melindasullivan.com

Melinda Sullivan (born September 30, 1987) is an American dancer, choreographer and actress. She is known for her work on the U.S. version of So You Think You Can Dance, where she was a contestant in the television series' seventh season, and as the 2012 winner of the Capezio A.C.E. Award. That entry, "Gone", debuted in expanded form in New York in August 2013. In 2021, she began a collaboration with jazz pianist Larry Goldings.

== Background, career ==
Born in East Meadow, New York, and raised in Thousand Oaks, California, Sullivan began tap dancing at a studio at age four, turning professional at age 14. "As a young girl, I found the freedom to be loud. To be brash. To be different than my family. Tap dancing allows me to express my artistic side, my creative side, my funny side, my rebellious side." Her mentors included Jason Samuels Smith and Chloe Arnold. As a high school senior, she won a role in the Cats 25th anniversary touring company, followed by the inaugural national tour of High School Musical on Stage!.

In 2009, she played Zoe Finn in the American soap opera As the World Turns. The following year, she was the third contestant to be sent home in the seventh season of the U.S. version of So You Think You Can Dance; it was the furthest any tap contestant had gone on the show until fellow tap contestant Aaron Turner finally topped her record in Season 10. In 2011, Sullivan toured with Jason Samuels Smith's A.C.G.I. troupe, which blended an improvisational style with traditional dance choreography. In 2016, she danced in the film La La Land's opening number, "Another Day of Sun", which was shot at the interchange of the Interstate 105 and 110 freeways.

In December 2017, she was one of a quartet of female dancers in Michelle Dorrance's Until the Real Thing Comes Along (a letter to ourselves), which debuted at New York's Joyce Theater. New York Times dance critic Gia Kourlas called Dorrance's collaborators—Sullivan, Jillian Meyers, and Josette Wiggan-Freund—"three singular and rhythmically brilliant dancers who are part of the traditional tap scene, but who also live in the commercial world."

=== Larry Goldings collaboration ===
In 2021 at the height of the COVID-19 lockdowns, Sullivan and jazz pianist Larry Goldings formed a duet. They first posted their improvisational rendition of Somewhere for a virtual party honoring Sullivan's father-in-law. They returned to Goldings’ home studio and backyard to do more, posting to their respective social media pages and generating online conversations “among jazz musicians, tap dancers and more mainstream music enthusiasts, with the likes of Sheila E., Robert Glasper, and Questlove chiming in,” wrote Brynn Shiovitz in the Los Angeles Times. As Covid restrictions lifted the following year, the pair began performing live. “Drawing from the worlds of jazz music, funk, commercial dance and underground tap, their eclectic collaboration has amassed them a dedicated fan club over Instagram and Patreon, who seek out their improvised magic in clubs all over Southern California.”

Shiovitz wrote that the duo is part of a tradition dating to the 1920s, when jazz music and tap dancing developed in parallel, each “crucial to the other’s evolution.” The 1921 broadway show Shuffle Along cemented the trend and the 1984 film The Cotton Club furthered it. “Since the early 2000s, however, this collaboration has gone more underground; Goldings and Sullivan’s platform marks a resurgence in its public visibility.”

Goldings credited Sullivan with having "all the skills of a great jazz instrumentalist." Jazz journalist Allen Morrison called them a new kind of jazz piano trio, with Goldings' right hand covering piano, his left hand on synth bass and Sullivan, performing on a portable board, the percussionist.

Big Foot, an album based on their work, was released in August 2024 on Colorfield Records.

=== Choreography ===
In 2012, Sullivan's dancing and choreography on her work "Gone" won Dance Teacher magazine's Capezio A.C.E. Award and its $15,000 production budget to create a show in New York. "In weathered boots and dresses that could have crossed the plains in a covered wagon, six tap dancers not only drill it down with their feet, they use their full bodies to convey loss and grief", wrote Dance Magazine. "'Gone' is a moody work that blends the drama of modern dance with the heart-pumping thrill of rhythm tap." The magazine named her among the "25 to Watch" for 2013.

An expanded version, Gone: A Sound and Theater Project, debuted at New York's Ailey Citigroup Theater on August 5, 2013, with a new score by Nikos Syropoulos. New York Times dance critic Brian Seibert noted Sullivan's aim of bridging two schools of tap dancing, rooted respectively in jazz and musical theater, and called it "a worthy goal" of admirable ambition, but felt that the story didn't cohere and the choreography was uneven. He called Sullivan's depiction of her grandmother as a young woman and a flashback set in Central Park "the work’s best scene. Here Ms. Sullivan, with a sly smile and a sense of wonder, is at her most engaging, and her choreography—setting the romantic duet amid interference by her six-member female ensemble—captures some of the playful joy of the musical-theater tradition." Seibert concluded that "what Ms. Sullivan is trying is very hard. The flaws of 'Gone' are no reason she shouldn't keep going."

== Work ==
	Title	Role
Dance	Gone	choreographer/dancer
Dance	Until the Real Thing Comes Along (a letter to ourselves)	dancer
Dance	Big Foot (album)	dancer/percussinist
Film	It's Complicated	dancer
Film	G.I. Joe 2: Retaliation	dancer
Film	La La Land	dancer
Film	Being the Ricardos	Ann Miller
Television	As the World Turns	Zoe Finn
Television	So You Think You Can Dance	contestant
Television	Dancing with the Stars	dancer
Television	Glee	dancer
Television	How to Rock	dancer
Television	Winning Time: The Rise of the Lakers Dynasty	dancer
Theater	High School Musical on Stage!	ensemble
Theater	Cats	swing
Theater	Wonderland	swing
