= Quantum Bigfoot =

Series of hard disk drives produced by Quantum Corp

The Quantum Bigfoot was a series of hard disk drives produced by Quantum Corporation from 1996 through the late 1990s. The Bigfoot series was notable for deviating from the standard form factor for hard drives. While most desktop hard drives at that time used a 3.5-inch physical format, Quantum Bigfoot drives used a larger 5.25-inch form factor more commonly seen in older hard drives, CD-ROM and other optical disc drives. This form factor allowed Quantum to increase the capacity of their hard drives without an increase in data density, thus lowering costs compared to a 3.5-inch drive with the same capacity. It also allowed manufacturers and owners to install the hard drive above or below the optical drive in the computer, as the typical computer had multiple 5.25-inch bays.

== Overview ==
The main rationale behind the use of the 5.25-inch form factor was that the typical PC user already owns cases that supports 5.25-inch drives, and by using lower data densities and fewer moving parts, Quantum was able to deliver the products at lower prices, thus more competitively.

Initially, performance in the Bigfoot drives generally lagged behind most other drives of the era, but the large data capacities earned inclusion in many OEM PCs such as ones manufactured by Compaq and HP, as well as popularity with the PC enthusiast community. IBM also used Bigfoot drives in some of their Aptiva PCs even though they were also a major manufacturer of hard drives. Over time, the data density (and therefore the overall capacity) of the drives increased, culminating in the 19.2 GB Bigfoot TS, easily the largest consumer-grade drive available at its release. A side effect of the increased data density was an increase in speed, moving the Bigfoot to middle-of-the-pack status amongst its contemporaries. Unfortunately, the increased manufacturing cost associated with the higher density also caused an increase in price, moving the Bigfoot towards a premium price. Over time, increased prices combined with stiff competition caused sales of the drives to decline, leading to the line being discontinued in the late 1990s.

Bigfoot drives were produced by a variety of different plants in Malaysia, Singapore, Japan and other locations. They were among the first to support Logical Block Addressing (LBA) and Self-Monitoring, Analysis, and Reporting Technology (S.M.A.R.T.) monitoring.

== Series ==
Four distinct series of Quantum Bigfoot drives were produced over time, with differences in capacity, spindle speed, access time and supported interface speed.

=== Quantum Bigfoot (original series) ===
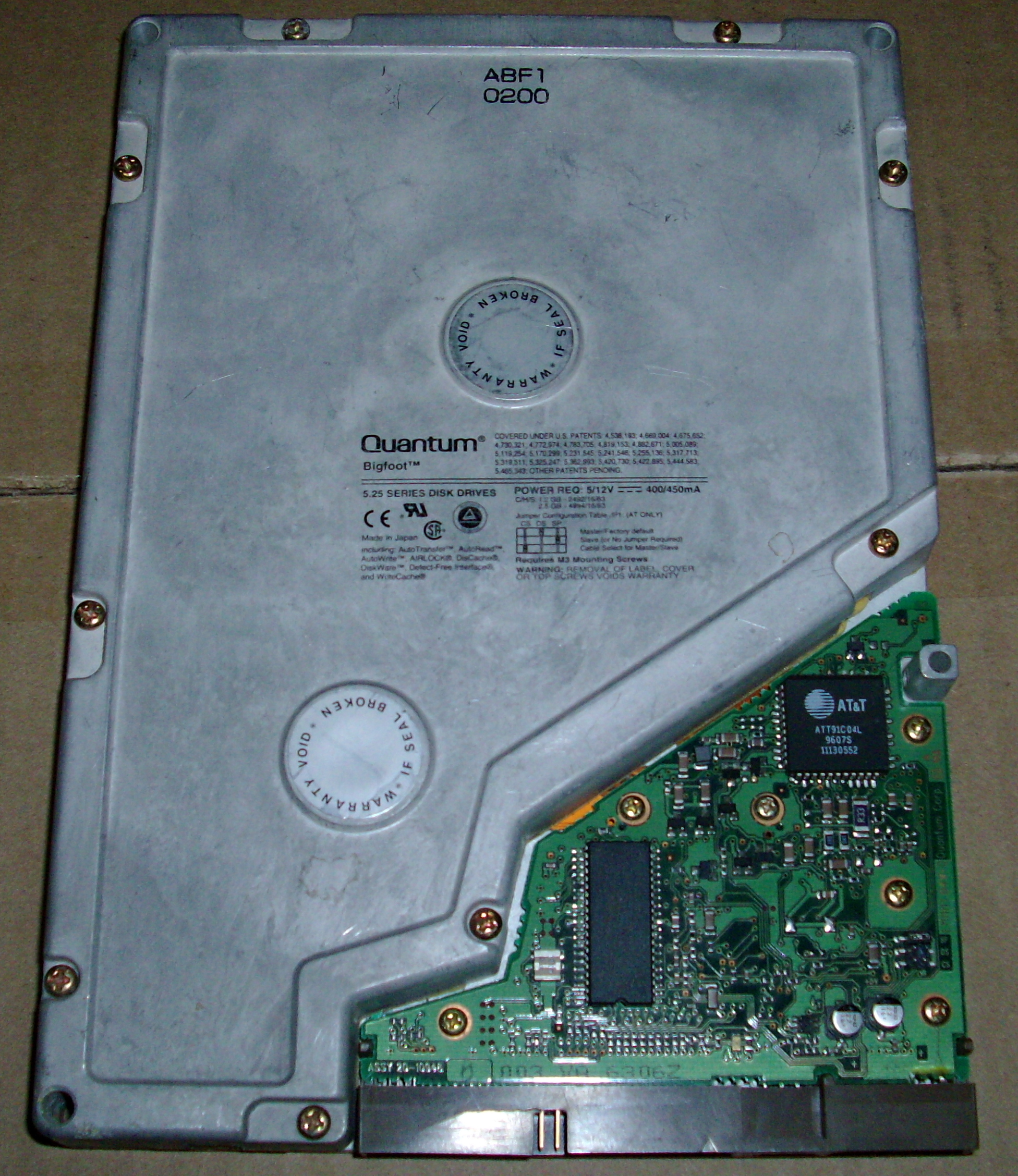
Retail 1.2/2.5 GB drive

The first generation Quantum Bigfoot drives were introduced around May 1996 and offered in capacities of 1.2 GB (1 platter, 2 heads) and 2.5 GB (2 platters, 4 heads), with suggested retail prices of $225 and $370 respectively. These drives offered only ATA-2 PIO Mode 4 and DMA mode 2 support (16.6 MB/s) and had an average seek time of 15 ms. Actual transfer rate from the platters was lower, measured at 813 KB/s by PC Magazine using Disk WinMark 96, slower than a same-capacity/similar-capacity Quantum Fireball (3.5") drive, which delivered 1170 KB/s.

=== Quantum Bigfoot CY ===
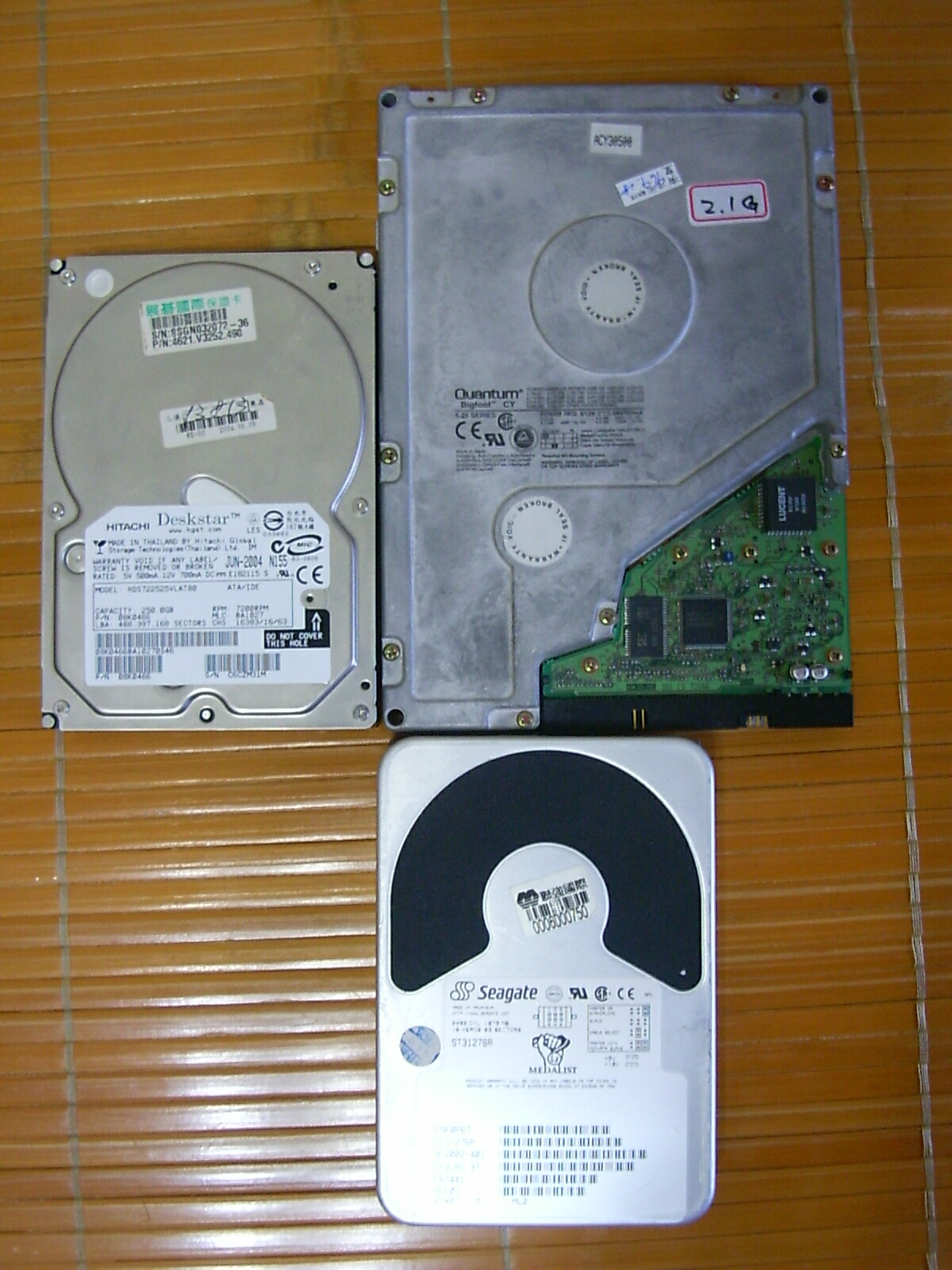
A 2.1 GB Bigfoot CY next to some 3.5" drives

The second series was the Quantum Bigfoot CY series, introduced around December 1996. Bigfoot CY drives shared the characteristics of a 3,600 RPM spindle speed and an ATA-2 interface connection. These drives had one to three 2.1 GB platters, and were produced in capacities of 2.1 GB, 4.3 GB and 6.4 GB. Their access time was advertised as being "as low as 12ms," and they had 128 KB of cache. The suggested retail prices were $224, $310 and $395, respectively. The largest drive of the CY series could transfer about 6 MB/sec from the platters when tested with hdparm -t in Linux.

=== Quantum Bigfoot TX ===
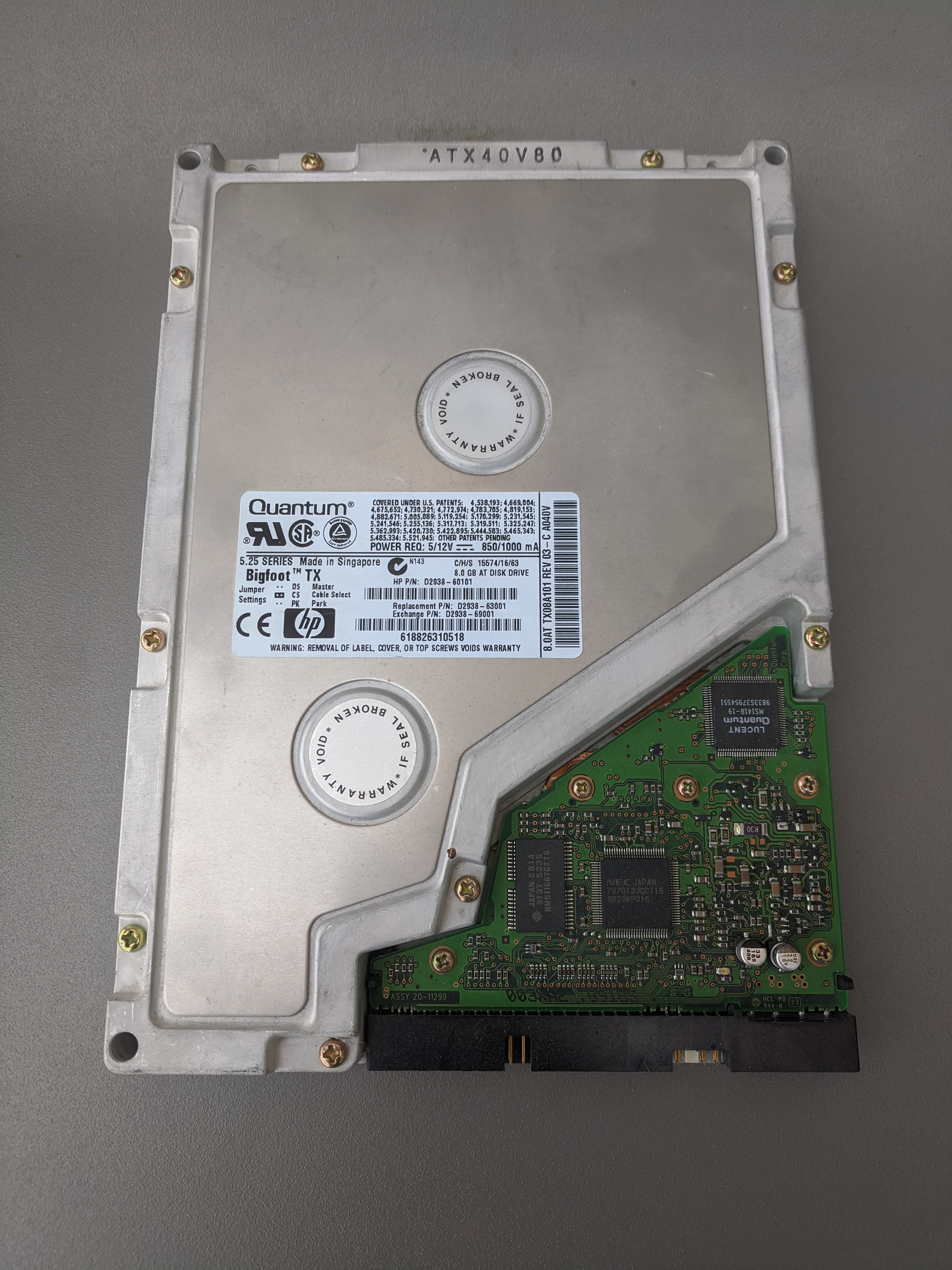
Quantum Bigfoot TX 8 GB with HP branding

The third series of Bigfoot drives was known as the Quantum Bigfoot TX series. This series increased the drives' spindle speed to 4,000 RPM and upgraded their interface capabilities to ATA-66. These drives carried the higher capacities of 4 GB, 6 GB, 8 GB and 12 GB. Like the CY series, access time was advertised as under 12 ms. The 12 GB model is noteworthy for being the first hard drive to attain a capacity in the double digits of gigabytes. Quantum claimed that these drives could outperform many of the 3.5-inch drives on the market at the time.

=== Quantum Bigfoot TS ===
The fourth and final series of Quantum Bigfoot drives produced was the Bigfoot TS series. This series retained the spindle speed and interface speed of its predecessor. The main performance enhancement was a reduction in access time, to "less than 10.5 ms." It was produced in capacities of 6.4 GB, 8.4 GB, 10.0 GB, 12.7 GB and 19.2 GB.

With this series, Quantum again claimed to have the highest capacity on the market with its 19.2 GB model. These drives had a new "shock protection system" designed to make the drives more resilient to physical shock, which Quantum called "one of the leading killers of disk drives." StorageReview found that this series was significantly faster than the TX series, though not as fast as most 3.5-inch drives available at the time. They also found it to be significantly louder than the TX series during use.
