= PrairieTek =

- Company type: Private
- Industry: Data storage
- Founded: 1985; 40 years ago in Longmont, Colorado, United States
- Founder: Terry Johnson
- Defunct: August 1991
- Fate: Bankruptcy liquidation
- Products: Hard disk drives

PrairieTek was a hard drive manufacturer located in Longmont, Colorado in the late 1980s and early 1990s. It was founded by Terry Johnson in 1985. It manufactured 5 and 10 megabyte "ruggedized" miniature hard drives for the laptop computer market.

Its PrairieTek 220 was the first 2.5 in (64 mm) hard drive, a potentially profitable move, but by the time the drive entered into mass production, its storage capacity was already low for the market. "PrairieTek's single disk 40MB model, potentially a cost-effective competitive product, was...late to market."

Unlike many manufacturers of the time, PrairieTek did not rest the drive heads on the disks, but instead used reverse EMF (ElectroMagnetic Force) to park the drives on a spreader bar. At the time all manufacturers parked heads on the platters in an out of the way place. When the platters spun up, with the increasingly smooth surface of the platter, the heads had a tendency to stick to the surface (sticktion) which resulted in ripping them off the arms. This dynamic loading of the heads avoided the problem and was a carry over from a previous design used in 8 inch removable drives.

The company first went into the black in September 1990, at which point co-founder Steve Volk and the core group of engineers resigned to found Intégral Peripherals, to develop 1.8" drives.

The company failed within a year of Volk leaving. The first round of layoffs started in February 1991, all production activity ceased at the end of June - and the company filed for Chapter 11 bankruptcy in September 1991.

The bidding war for PrairieTek's patent portfolio in 1992 rose to the then astounding price of $18M, paid by Conner Peripherals and Alps Electric - PrairieTek's patent #4,933,785 in particular was sought after.
