= Century Data Systems =

Defunct American data storage company

Century Data Systems, Inc.
- Type: Private (1968–1973, 1986 onward); Subsidiary (1973–1986)
- Industry: Computer
- Founded: 1968; 58 years ago in Anaheim, California, United States
- Founder: George Canova
- Parent: CalComp (1973–1979); Xerox (1979–1986)

Century Data Systems, Inc. (CDS), was an American computer data storage company active from 1968 to the late 1980s and based in Anaheim, California. The company was once a major supplier of large, high-performance, high-capacity hard disk drive subsystems to the enterprise and system integrator markets. The company's Trident line of pack-based disk drives were widely used by government, military, telecommunications, and other institutions which required high throughput. CDS was founded under the auspices of California Computer Products (CalComp), who later acquired CDS outright in 1973. In 1979, CalComp sold CDS to Xerox, who kept the company around as a subsidiary until 1986, when it was spun off into an independent company.

== History ==
Century Data Systems, Inc. (CDS) was founded in Anaheim, California, in late 1968, by George Canova, a former executive of Scientific Data Systems. Canova raised $1 million in start-up capital from Lester L. Kilpatrick, then the president California Computer Products (CalComp). CalComp had previously been in the business of computer graphics products, especially plotters. The deal with CDS represented CalComp's first big break into the computer data storage market. Under the terms of funding, CalComp took over sales of CDS's products to end users, while CDS was responsible for sales to third-party system integrators and OEMs. Originally only a sizeable stakeholder, CalComp's ownership of CDS grew to 94 percent over the next three years.

CDS established its headquarters in a 288,000-square-foot office complex in Anaheim in December 1968, which it maintained throughout its entire existence. By the beginning of 1969, the company had 20 employees. That year it introduced its first product, the CD-111, which was a pack-based hard disk drive subsystem, plug-compatible with IBM's 2311 Disk Storage Drive. In 1970, it introduced another disk drive subsystem plug-compatible with IBM's 2314 Disk Access Storage Facility. By 1971, the CD-111 generated more than US$40 million in sales and represented roughly 20 percent of CDS's output. Most of the company's sales were to European countries. By August 1971, CDS had grown to over 800 employees.

In October 1972, CalComp announced its intention to acquire the remaining 6-percent ownership from CDS's minority stakeholders in order to acquire the company outright. The deal was finalized in 1973. Under ownership of CalComp, CDS continued developing disk drives while also branching out into tape drives and floppy drives. Later on, CalComp dropped the "Century Data Systems" nameplate and renamed the subsidiary to the Memory Products Division (MPD). In 1976, Canova was succeeded by James Y. Payton as president of CalComp MPD. Canova simultaneously took the mantle of CalComp's president, replacing Kilpatrick, who retained his status as chairman.

Toward the end of the 1970s, CalComp had run itself into significant debt, and in November 1978 the company negotiated with Xerox to sell off CalComp MPD. In March 1979, Xerox completed their acquisition of MPD for $25 million, with Payton retaining his role. The only assets of MPD's not transferred over to Xerox were its floppy drives, which CalComp retained continued selling under its mainline brand. Following the acquisition, Xerox restored the Century Data Systems name.

By mid-1986, CDS was running heavy losses for Xerox, according to The New York Times, and in July that year the company began talks with the investor William A. Klein to acquire the division. Xerox had shed multiple divisions related to data storage in the years prior, including Shugart Associates (inventors of the 5.25-inch floppy disk) and Optimem Inc. (makers of optical disc drives). By September 1986, Xerox completed its sale of CDS to Klein, who reincorporated it as an independent spin-off. Per Xerox's quarterly report, the sale of CDS to Klein was worth $12 million. Klein kept CDS around for at least another year. Between September and October 1986, it acquired Amcodyne, Inc., a private company based in Longmont, Colorado, that manufactured 8-inch hard disk drives.
