= Men Reading =

Painting by Francisco de Goya

- Hombres leyendo (Spanish)
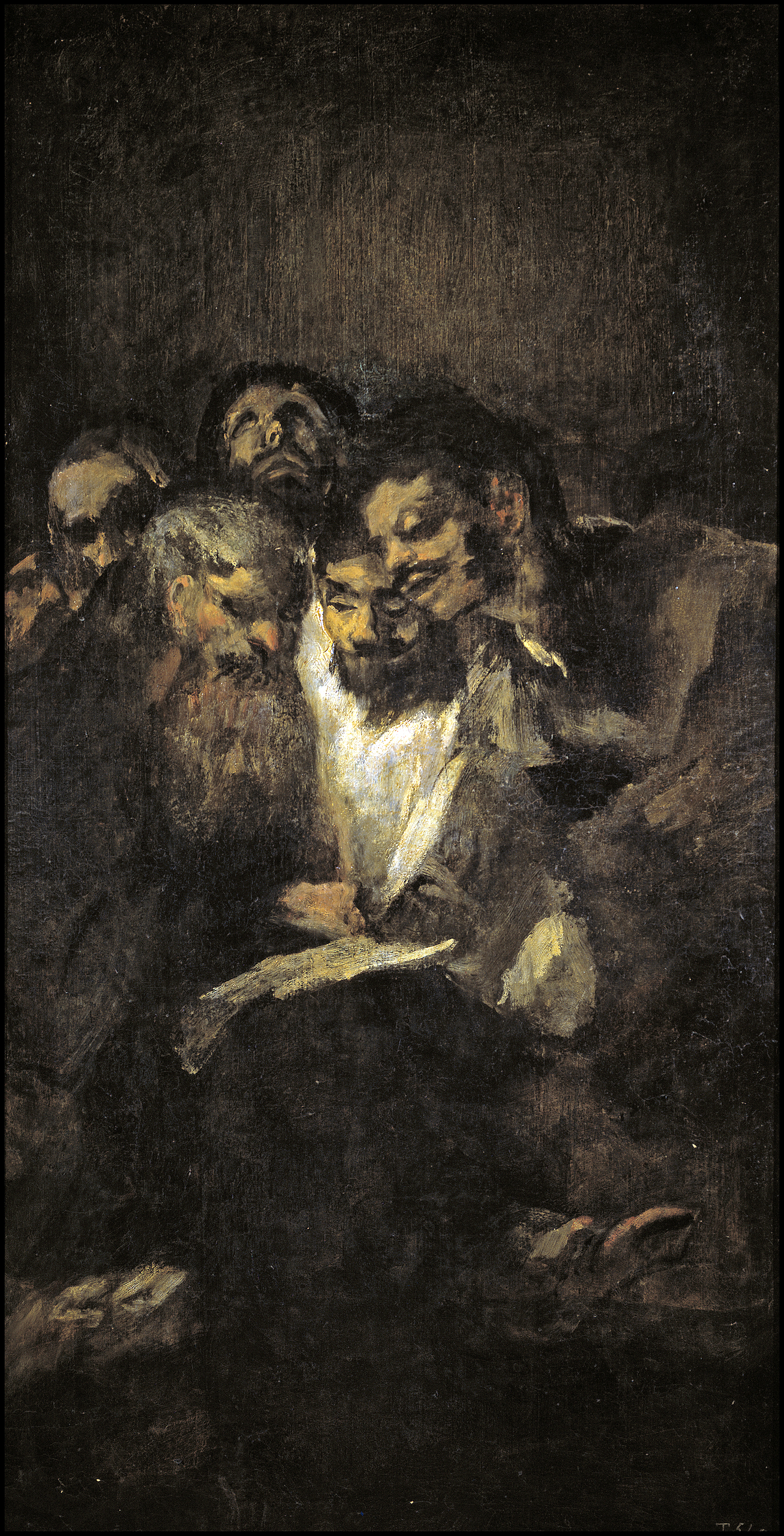
- Artist: Francisco Goya
- Year: c. 1820–1823
- Medium: Oil on gesso transferred to linen
- Dimensions: 125.3 cm × 65.2 cm (49.3 in × 25.7 in)
- Location: Museo del Prado, Madrid

Men Reading or The Reading (Spanish: La Lectura) or Politicians are names given to a fresco painting likely completed between 1820 and 1823 by the Spanish artist Francisco Goya. It is one of Goya's 14 Black Paintings (Pinturas negras) painted late in his life when, living alone in physical pain, spiritual torment and disillusionment with the political direction of Spain, he painted 14 bleak, agonised frescoes onto the walls of the Quinta del Sordo (House of the deaf man), the house he was living in alone outside Madrid.

As with the others in the series, it was transferred to canvas in 1873–74 under the supervision of Salvador Martínez Cubells, a curator at the Museo del Prado. The owner, Baron Emile d'Erlanger, donated the work to the Spanish state in 1881, and they are now on display at the Prado.

== Description ==
Men Reading shows a group of six men huddled together reading a printed page held in the lap of a seated central figure. Although it is not known for certain, they are often thought to be politicians reading, and passing comments on a newspaper article about themselves. Goya most likely placed the work on a smaller wall of the first floor of the Quinto, next to its companion piece Women Laughing and opposite The Dog and Two Old Men Eating Soup.

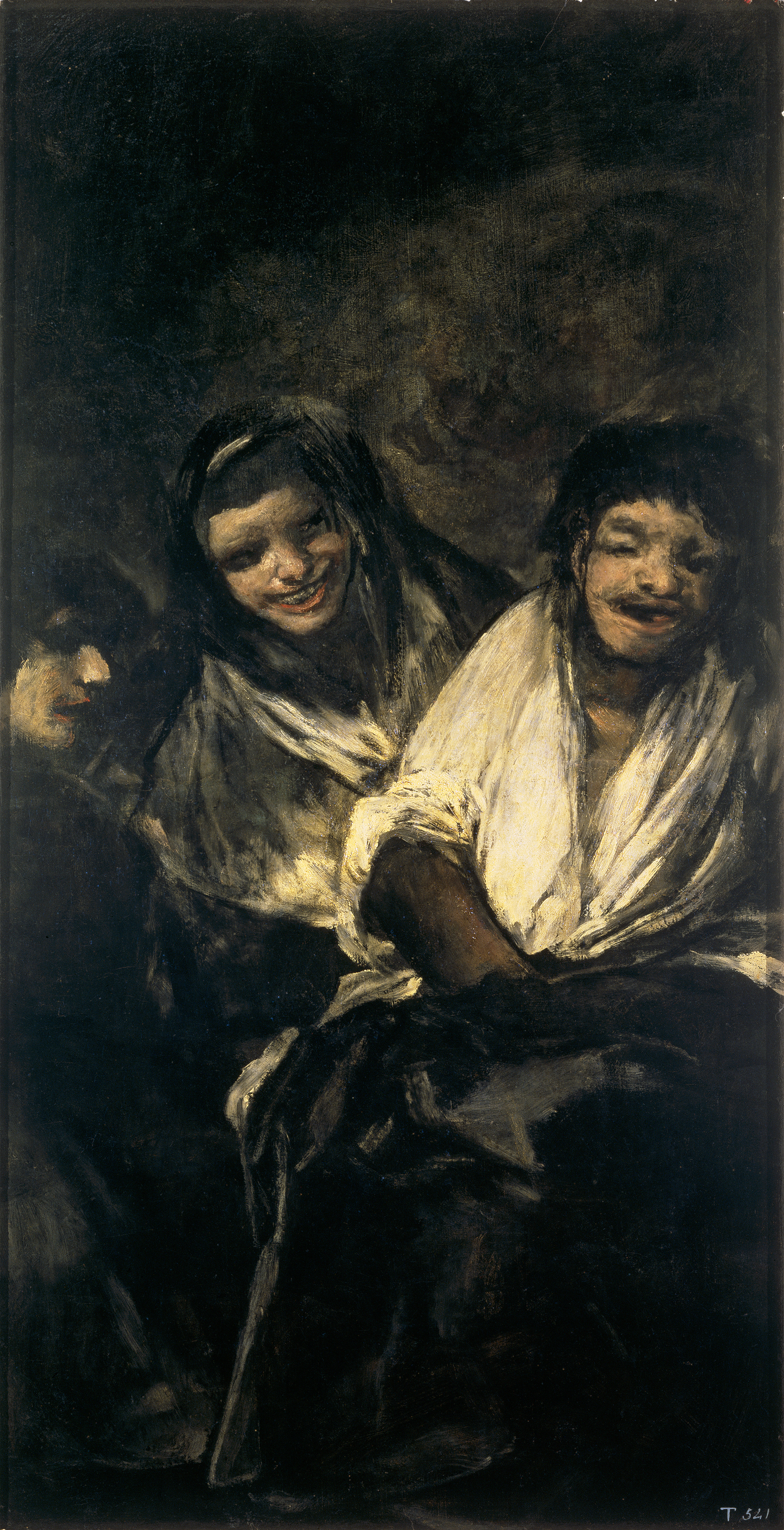
Women Laughing is often seen as a companion work, a feminine counterpart to Men Reading

X-ray reveals that the image was dramatically altered before Goya settled on what is now on the canvas. At some stage a landscape in the background showed a mounted rider. At one point, the central figure in white had large horns, or possibly bird wings, seemingly growing out of his head. From studying the x-rays, art historian Carmen Garrido discovered that the centre of the image contained a large white lead impasto beginning at the head of the man looking upwards, and that "both the part on top of the impasto and that which is level with the rest of the painting are identical, and have neither the texture nor the normal structure of the authentic brushstrokes of the painter."

Thematically and stylistically, it shares characteristics with another work from the Black Paintings series, Women Laughing. Both are vertical rather than horizontal and smaller in scale than the other works. Both are thematically less dark than the other works in the series, although they are chromatically darker. Both are lit by identical light falling from the upper left of the pictorial space. Women Laughing shows two hags mocking a man in the act of masturbating, while in Men Reading, according to writer Francisco-Xavier de Salas Bosch, "the incessant talk of the politicians...was perhaps, in Goya’s eyes, as sterile as the solitary pleasure which the women are making fun of."

== Bibliography ==
- de Salas Bosch, Francisco-Xavier. Goya. NY:Mayflower Books, 1978. ISBN 0-289-70887-7
- Junquera, Juan José. The Black Paintings of Goya. London: Scala Publishers, 2008. ISBN 1-85759-273-5
- Hughes, Robert. Goya. New York: Alfred A. Knopf, 2004. ISBN 0-394-58028-1
- Licht, Fred. Goya: The Origins of the Modern temper in Art. Universe Books, 1979. ISBN 0-87663-294-0
