= Lust =

Human emotion

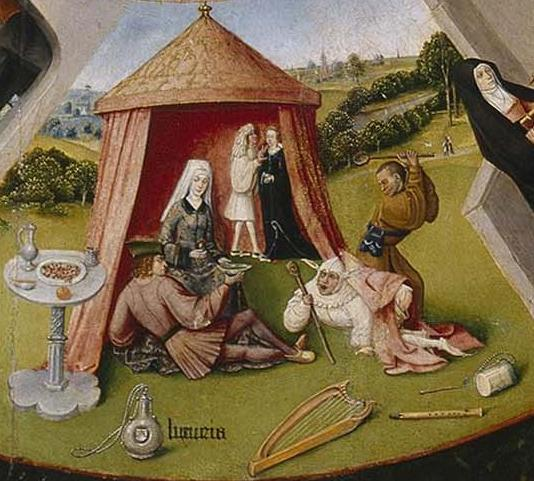
Detail: Luxuria (Lust), in The Seven Deadly Sins and the Four Last Things, by Hieronymus Bosch

Lust is an intense desire for something. Lust can take any form such as the lust for sexual activity (see libido), money, or power; but it can also take such mundane forms as the lust for food (see gluttony; as distinct from the need for food) or the lust for redolence (when one is lusting for a particular smell that brings back memories). Lust is similar to, but distinguished from, passion, in that properly ordered passion propels individuals to achieve benevolent goals whilst lust does not.

== In religion ==
Religions tend to draw a distinction between passion and lust by further categorizing lust as an immoral desire and passion as morally accepted.

Lust is defined as immoral because its object or action of affection is improperly ordered according to natural law and/or the appetite for the particular object (eg sexual desire) is governing the person's will and intellect rather than the will and intellect governing the appetite for that object.

Conversely, passion, regardless of its strength, is maintained to be something God-given and moral, because the purpose, actions and intentions behind it are benevolent and ordered toward creation, while also being governed by the person's intellect and will. A primary school of thought on this is Thomism, which speaks on the intellect, will and appetite, and draws from principles defined by Aristotle. However, the exact definitions assigned to what is morally definite and ordered toward creation depend on the religion. For example, religions based in pantheism and theism will differ on what is moral according to the nature of the "God" acknowledged or worshipped.

=== Abrahamic religions ===
==== Judaism ====
In Judaism, all evil inclinations and lusts of the flesh are characterized by Yetzer hara (Hebrew, יצר הרע, the evil inclination). Yetzer hara is not a demonic force; rather, it is man's misuse of the things which the physical body needs to survive, and is often contrasted with yetzer hatov (Hebrew, יצר הטוב, the positive desire).

Yetzer Hara is often identified with Satan and the angel of death, and there is sometimes a tendency to give a personality and separate activity to the yetzer. For the yetzer, like Satan, misleads man in this world, and testifies against him in the world to come. The yetzer is, however, clearly distinguished from Satan, and on other occasions is made exactly parallel to sin. The Torah is considered the great antidote against this force. Though, like all things which God has made, the yetzer hara (evil inclination) can be manipulated into doing good: for without it, man would never marry, beget a child, build a house, or occupy himself in a trade.

==== Christianity ====
===== New Testament =====
In many translations of the New Testament, the word "lust" translates the Koine Greek word ἐπιθυμέω (epithūméō), particularly in Matthew 5:27-28:

Ye have heard that it was said by them of old time, Thou shalt not commit adultery: But I say unto you, That whosoever looketh on a woman to lust (ἐπιθυμέω) after her hath committed adultery with her already in his heart.

In English-speaking countries, the term "lust" is often associated with sexual desire, probably because of this verse. However, just as the English word was originally a general term for 'desire', the Greek word ἐπιθυμέω was also a general term for desire. The LSJ lexicon suggests "set one's heart upon a thing, long for, covet, desire" as glosses for ἐπιθυμέω, which is used in verses that clearly have nothing to do with sexual desire. In the Septuagint, ἐπιθυμέω is the word used in the commandment not to covet:

You shall not covet your neighbour's wife; you shall not covet your neighbour's house or his field or his male slave or his female slave or his ox or his draft animal or any animal of his or whatever belongs to your neighbour.

— Exodus 20:17, New English Translation of the Septuagint

While coveting your neighbour's wife may involve sexual desire, it's unlikely that coveting a neighbour's house or field is sexual in nature. And in most New Testament uses, the same Greek word, ἐπιθυμέω, does not have a clear sexual connotation. For example, from the American Standard Version the same word is used outside of any sexual connotation:

1. Matthew 13:17: For verily I say unto you, that many prophets and righteous men desired to see the things which ye see, and saw them not; and to hear the things which ye hear, and heard them not.
2. Luke 22:15-16: And he said unto them, With desire I have desired to eat this passover with you before I suffer: for I say unto you, I shall not eat it, until it be fulfilled in the kingdom of God.
3. Acts 20:33: I coveted no man's silver, or gold, or apparel. Ye yourselves know that these hands ministered unto my necessities, and to them that were with me.
4. Luke 15:14-16: And when he had spent all, there arose a mighty famine in that country; and he began to be in want. And he went and joined himself to one of the citizens of that country; and he sent him into his fields to feed swine. And he would fain have filled his belly with the husks that the swine did eat: and no man gave unto him.

===== Catholicism =====
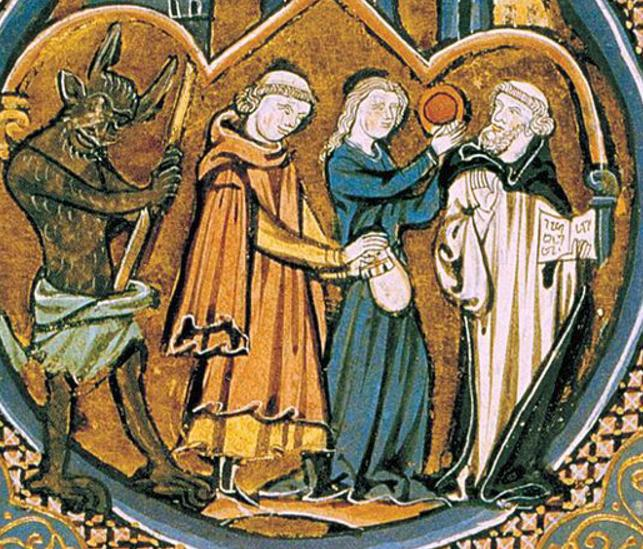
A demon satiating his lust in a 13th-century manuscript

According to the Catholic Encyclopedia, a Christian's heart is lustful when "venereal satisfaction is sought for either outside wedlock or, at any rate, in a manner which is contrary to the laws that govern marital intercourse". Pope John Paul II said that lust devalues the eternal attraction of male and female, reducing personal riches of the opposite sex to an object for gratification of sexuality.

Lust is considered by Catholicism to be a disordered desire for sexual pleasure, where sexual pleasure is "sought for itself, isolated from its procreative and unitive purposes". In Catholicism, sexual desire in itself is good, and is considered part of God's plan for humanity. However, when sexual desire is separated from God's love, it becomes disordered and self-seeking. This is seen as lust.

St. Thomas Aquinas differentiates between sexual intercourse within marriage, which is seen as meritorious through giving justice to one's spouse, and sins of lust which can themselves be differentiated in magnitude of immorality according to intention and action. For example, Aquinas says in the Summa Theologica II-II, q. 154, a. 12 "I answer that, In every genus, worst of all is the corruption of the principle on which the rest depend. Now the principles of reason are those things that are according to nature, because reason presupposes things as determined by nature, before disposing of other things according as it is fitting." He uses St. Augustine as his source writing "Augustine says that 'of all these,' namely the sins belonging to lust, 'that which is against nature is the worst.'" Which St. Thomas clarifies means that they are greater than sins against justice pertaining to the genus of lust, such as rape or incest, in his statement "Reply to Objection 3: The nature of the species is more intimately united to each individual, than any other individual is. Wherefore sins against the specific nature are more grievous." Thus St. Thomas gives the order of magnitude of lustful acts as: "The most grievous is the sin of bestiality, because use of the due species is not observed...(Then) the sin of sodomy, because use of the right sex is not observed...(Then) the sin of not observing the right manner of copulation (or the unatural act or masturbation)... (Then) incest... is contrary to the natural respect which we owe persons related to us... Then, it is a greater injustice to have intercourse with a woman who is subject to another's authority as regards the act of generation, than as regards merely her guardianship. Wherefore adultery is more grievous than seduction. And both of these are aggravated by the use of violence."

The Latin for extravagance (Latin: luxuria) was used by St. Jerome to translate a variety of biblical sins, including drunkenness and sexual excess. Gregory the Great placed luxuria as one of the seven capital sins (it is often considered the least serious of the seven deadly sins), narrowing its scope to disordered desire, and it was in this sense that the Middle Ages generally took luxuria, (although the Old French cognate was adopted into English as luxury without its sexual meaning by the 14th century).

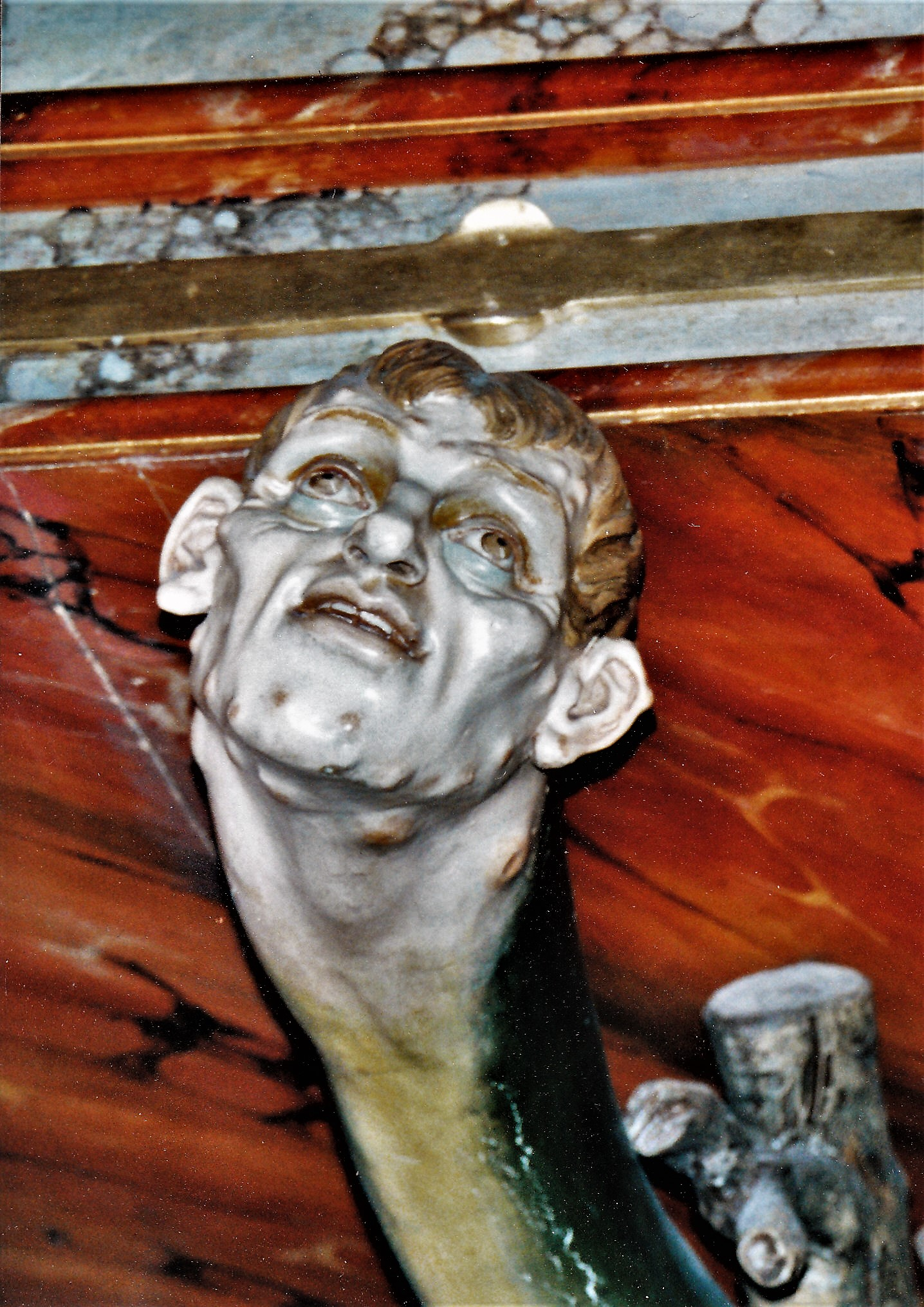
Detail of Lust at the Sankt Bartholomäus church (Reichenthal), Pulpit (1894)

In Romanesque art, the personified Luxuria is generally feminine, often represented by a siren or a naked woman with breasts being bitten by snakes. Prudentius in his Psychomachia or 'Battle of the Soul' had described

Luxury, lavish of her ruined fame, Loose-haired, wild-eyed, her voice a dying fall, Lost in delight....

For Dante, Luxuria was both the first of the circles of incontinence (or self-indulgence) on the descent into hell, and the last of the cornices of Mount Purgatory, representing the excessive (disordered) love of individuals; while for Edmund Spenser, luxuria was synonymous with the power of desire.

For Gregory and subsequent Thomists, the 'daughters' (by-products) of Luxuria included mental blindness, self-love, haste, and excessive attachment to the present. Marianne Dashwood has been seen as embodying such characteristics for a later age – as a daughter of Luxuria.

The Catholic Church defines lust as the idolatry of sexual pleasure, in all of its forms: contraception, masturbation, adultery, premarital relations, relations between persons of the same sex, etc, which destroys the human capacity of loving, that is, of the person to give themselves to God and to others.

==== Islam ====
In Islam, lust is considered one of the primitive states of the self, called the nafs. In sufi psychology, according to Robert Frager, nafs is an aspect of psyche that begins as our worst adversary but can develop into an invaluable tool.

In the Quran there is a passage when Zuleikha admits that she sought to seduce prophet Joseph (Arabic: Yousuf), and then prophet Joseph said: "Yet I claim not that my soul was innocent—surely the soul of man [nafs] incites to evil—except inasmuch as my Lord had mercy; truly my Lord is All-forgiving, All-compassionate." (Qur'an 12:53). Al-Ghazali, in his major works Ihya' Ulum al-Din (The Revival of Religious Sciences), stated that nafs in this passage is the lowest state of the soul, called nafs al-ammara (evil soul); while the other states of the soul are nafs al-mulhama (questioning soul), nafs al-lawwama (self-accusing soul), and nafs al-mutmainna (contented soul).

Muslims are encouraged to overcome their baser instincts and intentional lascivious glances are forbidden. Lascivious thoughts are disliked, for they are the first step towards adultery, rape, and other antisocial behaviors. The Islamic prophet Muhammad also stressed the magnitude of the "second glance", as while the first glance towards an attractive member of the opposite sex could be just accidental or observatory, the second glance could be that gate into lustful thinking.

=== Indian religions ===
==== Buddhism ====
Lust holds a critical position in the philosophical underpinnings of Buddhist reality. It is named in the second of the Four Noble Truths, which are that

1. Suffering (dukkha) is inherent in all life.
2. Suffering is caused by desire.
3. There is a natural way to eliminate all suffering from one's life.
4. The ending of desire eliminates all suffering from someones life.

Lust is the attachment to, identification with, and passionate desire for certain things in existence, all of which relate to the form, sensation, perception, mentality, and consciousness that certain combinations of these things engender within us. Lust is thus the ultimate cause of general imperfection and the most immediate root cause of a certain suffering.

The passionate desire for either non-existence or for freedom from lust is a common misunderstanding. For example, the headlong pursuit of lust (or other "deadly sin") in order to fulfill a desire for death is followed by a reincarnation accompanied by a self-fulfilling karma, resulting in an endless wheel of life, until the right way to live, the right worldview, is somehow discovered and practiced. Beholding an endless knot puts one, symbolically, in the position of the one with the right worldview, representing that person who attains freedom from lust.

In existence there are four kinds of things that engender clinging (attachment): rituals, worldviews, pleasures, and the self. The way to eliminate lust is to learn of its unintended effects and to pursue righteousness as concerns a worldview, intention, speech, behavior, livelihood, effort, mindfulness, and concentration, in the place where lust formerly sat.

==== Sikhism ====
In Sikhism, lust is counted among the five cardinal sins or sinful propensities, the others being wrath, ego, greed and attachment. Uncontrollable expression of sexual lust, as in rape or sexual addiction, is an evil.

=== Indian spirituality ===
==== Brahma Kumaris ====
According to Brahma Kumaris, a spiritual organization which is based on Karmic philosophy, sexual lust is the greatest enemy to all mankind.

For this reason followers do not eat onions, garlic, eggs, or non-vegetarian food, as the "sulphur" in them can excite sexual lust in the body, otherwise bound to celibacy.

The physical act of sex is "impure", leading to body-consciousness and other crimes. This impurity "poisons" the body and leads to many kinds of "diseases".

The Brahma Kumaris teaches that sexuality is foraging about in a dark sewer. Students at Spiritual University must conquer lust, to prevent sin, and in order to be closer to god.

They describe the differences between lust and love thus:

In lust there is reliance upon the object of sense and consequent spiritual subordination of the soul to it, but love puts the soul into direct and co-ordinate relation with the reality which is behind the form. Therefore, lust is experienced as being heavy and love is experienced as being light. In lust there is a narrowing down of life and in love there is an expansion in being...If you love the whole world you vicariously live in the whole world, but in lust there is an ebbing down of life and a general sense of hopeless dependence upon a form which is regarded as another. Thus, in lust there is the accentuation of separateness and suffering, but in love there is the feeling of unity and joy...

=== Paganism ===
The most famous example of a widespread religious movement practicing lechery as a ritual is the Bacchanalia of the Ancient Roman Bacchantes. However, this activity was soon outlawed by the Roman Senate in 186 BC in the decree Senatus consultum de Bacchanalibus. The practice of sacred prostitution, however, continued to be an activity practiced often by the Dionysians.

== In culture ==
=== Medieval prostitutes ===
Medieval prostitutes lived in officially sanctioned "red light districts". In Ruth Mazo Karras' book Common Women, the author discusses the meaning of prostitution and how people thought the proper use of prostitutes by unmarried men helped contain male lust. Prostitution was thought to have a beneficial effect by reducing sexual frustration in the community. Inquisitors accused the Waldensians of believing that satisfying lust was better than being harassed by fleshly temptation.

=== 18th and 19th centuries ===
In the 1899 text Soul Laws in Sexual, Social, and Spiritual Life, F.S. Heath discussed promiscuity in relation to heredity, claiming that "children inherit the peculiarities of the parents in soul, mind, and body” though despite this, “every person, by putting forth an earnest effort to do so, and seeking the help of God, can always overcome all besetments.” Approximately 4,000 copies of the book were in print by 1902. Reflecting the prevailing attitude of the time, Heath noted:

Husbands and wives do well when they yield to every good impulse, and abandon themselves to love each other in the marriage bed. They should be thoughtful, intelligent, prayerful and pure in heart and mind, instead of lustful beasts. The natural result of being such when child-life commences is to impart such qualities to it, and thus bring many years of satisfaction and comfort to themselves in the work and associations with such a child. If filled with oratory, music, business, mathematics, literature, art, piety, honor, ambition, etc., such a nature would naturally be transmitted. If with selfishness, dishonesty, deception, beastliness, recklessness, unbelief, lust, devilishness, bad temper, jealousy, etc., a like character will naturally follow in the child. Parents can thus easily bring a lifetime curse to their child, and through it to themselves, their future descendants, and humanity.

== In art ==
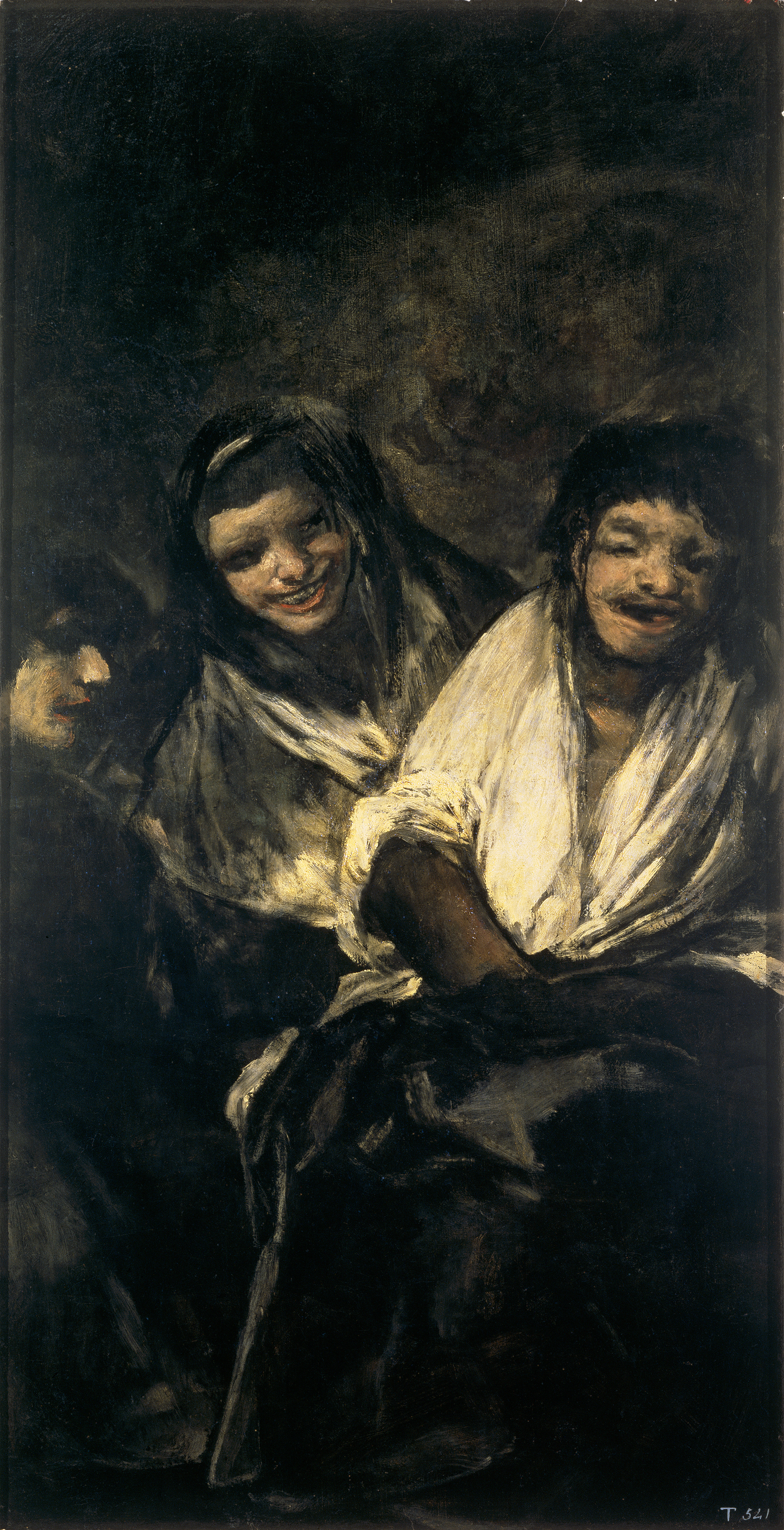
Goya's Man Mocked by Two Women (Dos Mujeres y un hombre), c. 1820

=== Literature ===
From Ovid to the works of les poètes maudits, characters have always been faced with scenes of lechery, and for time out of mind lust has been a common motif in world literature. Many writers, such as Georges Bataille, Casanova and Prosper Mérimée, have written works wherein scenes take place at bordellos and other unseemly locales.

Baudelaire, author of Les fleurs du mal, had once remarked, in regard to the artist, that:

The more a man cultivates the arts, the less randy he becomes... Only the brute is good at coupling, and copulation is the lyricism of the masses. To copulate is to enter into another—and the artist never emerges from himself.

The most notable work to touch upon the sin of lust, (and also upon the other Seven Deadly Sins), is Dante's Divine Comedy. Dante's criterion for lust was an "excessive love of others", insofar as an excessive love for man would render one's love of God secondary. In the first canticle of the Divine Comedy—the Inferno—the lustful are punished by being continuously swept around in a whirlwind, symbolizing their ungovernable passions. The damned who are guilty of lust, like the two famous lovers, Paolo and Francesca, receive in Hell exactly what they desired most in their mortal lives, only to find that their passions will give them no rest for all eternity. In Purgatorio, of the selfsame work, the penitents choose to walk through flames in order to purge themselves of their lustful inclinations.

== In philosophy ==
The link between love and lust has always been a problematic question in philosophy.

=== Schopenhauer ===
Schopenhauer notes the misery which results from sexual relationships. According to him, this directly explains the sentiments of shame and sadness which tend to follow the act of sexual intercourse; for, he states, the only power that reigns is the inextinguishable desire to face, at any price, the blind love present in human existence without any consideration of the outcome. He estimates that a genius of his species is an industrial being who wants only to produce, and wants only to think. The theme of lust for Schopenhauer is thus to consider the horrors which will almost certainly follow the culmination of lust.

=== St Thomas Aquinas ===
St Thomas Aquinas defines the sin of lust in questions 153 and 154 of his Summa Theologica. Aquinas says the sin of lust is of "voluptuous emotions", and makes the point that sexual pleasures, "unloosen the human spirit", and set aside right reason (p. 191). Aquinas restricts lust's subject matter to physical desires specifically arising from sexual acts, but he does not assume all sex-acts are sinful. Sex is not a sin in marriage, because sex is the only way for humans to reproduce. If sex is used naturally and the end purpose is reproduction there is no sin. Aquinas says, "if the end be good and if what is done is well-adapted to that, then no sin is present" (p. 193). However, sex simply for the sake of pleasure is lustful, and therefore a sin. A man who uses his body for lechery wrongs the Lord.

Sex may have the attributes of being sinless; however, when a person seeks sex for pleasure, he or she is sinning with lust. Lust is best defined by its specific attribute of rape, adultery, wet dreams, seduction, unnatural vice, and simple fornication.

Wet dreams: St Thomas Aquinas defined and discussed the topic of nocturnal emission, which occurs when one dreams of physical pleasure. Aquinas argues those who say that wet dreams are a sin and comparable to the actual experience of sex are wrong. Aquinas believes that such an action is sinless, for a dream is not under a person's control or free judgment. When one has a "nocturnal orgasm", it is not a sin, but it can lead to sins (p. 227). Aquinas says that wet dreams come from a physical cause of inappropriate pictures within your imagination, a psychological cause when thinking of sex while you fall asleep and a demonical cause whereby demons act upon the sleeper's body, "stirring the sleeper's imagination to bring about a orgasm" (p. 225). In the end, though, dreaming of lustful acts is not sinful. The "mind's awareness is less hindered", as the sleeper lacks right reason; therefore, a person cannot be accountable for what they dream while sleeping (p. 227).

Adultery: One of the main forms of lust seen frequently during the Middle Ages was the sin of adultery. The sin of adultery occurs when a person is unfaithful to their spouse, hence "invading of a bed not one's own" (p. 235). Adultery is a special kind of ugliness and many difficulties arise from it. When a man enters the bed of a married woman it not only is a sin, but it "wrongs the offspring", because the woman now calls into question the legitimacy of children (p. 235). If a wife has committed adultery before, then, her husband will question if all his wife's children are his offspring.

Simple fornication: Simple fornication is having sex with one's spouse for enjoyment rather than for bearing children. Fornication is also sex between two unmarried people, which is also a mortal sin. Aquinas says that "fornication is a deadly crime" (p. 213). Fornication is a mortal sin, but as Aquinas notes, "Pope Gregory treated sins of the flesh as less grievous than those of the spirit" (p. 217). Fornication was a grave sin such as that against property. Fornication, however, is not as grave as a sin directly against God and human life; therefore, murder is much worse than fornication. Property in this case means that a daughter is the property of her father, and if one does wrong to her, one then does wrong to him; therefore seducing a virgin or seeking pleasure from an unmarried woman is an invasion of a father's property.

Seduction: Seduction is a type of lust, because seduction is a sex act, which ravishes a virgin. Lust is a sin of sexual activity, and "...a special quality of wrong that appears if a maid still under her father's care is debauched" (p. 229). Seduction involves a discussion of property, as an unmarried girl is property of her father. A virgin, even though free from the bond of marriage, is not free from the bond of her family. When a virgin is violated without a promise of engagement, she is prevented from having honorable marriage, which is shameful to herself and her family. A man who performs sexual acts with a virgin must "endow her and have her to wife", and if the father, who is responsible for her, says no, then a man must pay a dowry to compensate for her loss of virginity and future chance of marriage (p. 229).

Unnatural vice: Unnatural vice is the worst kind of lust because it is unnatural in act and purpose. Many varieties of unnatural vice exist; Aquinas provides several examples, including bestiality or intercourse with a "thing of another species" (for example, an animal), incest, sodomy and "not observing the right manner of copulation".

== In psychoanalysis and psychology ==
Lust, in the domain of psychoanalysis and psychology, is often treated as a case of "heightened libido".

== See also ==
- Taṇhā
