= Transfer of panel paintings =

Art conservation method

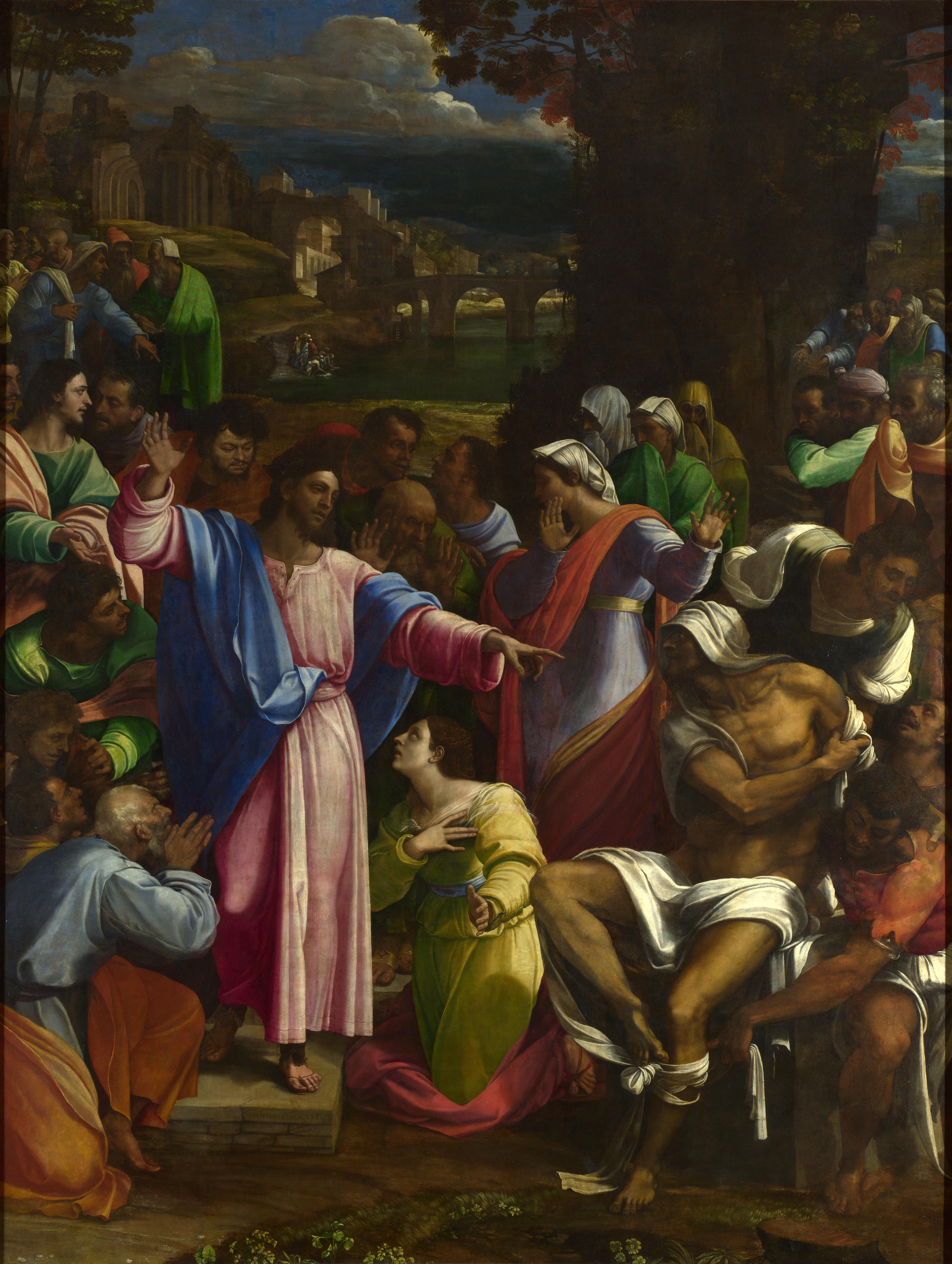
Sebastiano del Piombo's The Raising of Lazarus was transferred from panel to canvas in 1771.

The practice of conserving an unstable painting on panel by transferring it from its original decayed, worm-eaten, cracked, or distorted wood support to canvas or a new panel has been practised since the 18th century. It has now been largely superseded by improved methods of wood conservation.

The practice evolved in Naples and Cremona in 1711–1725 and reached France by the middle of the 18th century. It was especially widely practiced in the second half of the 19th century. Similar techniques are used to transfer frescos. Oil paintings on canvas often receive additional support or are transferred to a new backing.

== Methods ==
The process is described by Henry Mogford in his Handbook for the Preservation of Pictures. Smooth sheets of paper were pasted over the painted surface of the panel, and a layer of muslin over that. The panel was then fixed, face down, to a table, and the wood planed away from the back until it was "as thin as a plane may safely go", and the remainder scraped off with a sharp instrument such as a razor. The ground of the painting (the layer used to prepare a support for painting) was then removed by solvents or scraping, until nothing remained but a thin skin of colour, pasted over with paper and held together by the muslin. A prepared canvas was then attached to the back of the paint layer, using the same method as was used for lining pictures. When the glue had dried, the paper and muslin were removed by careful damping.

The leading workshop carrying out the process in Paris in the eighteenth century was that of Jean-Louis Hacquin (d. 1783), who transferred many works in the French royal collection. Transfers from the workshop have sometimes been found to have a layer of pieces of silk, or of sheets of paper between the paint layer and the new canvas. The workshop was continued after Hacquin's death by his son, François-Toussaint Hacquin (1756–1832), who transferred many paintings taken to France from Italy during the Napoleonic period.

Another method, used by Hacquin's contemporary, Jean-Michel Picault, dissolved the ground layer chemically, apparently with fumes of nitrous oxide, allowing the panel to be removed intact from the paint. A later restorer, Marie-Jacob Godefroid is recorded as having achieved similar results by the use of steam.

A less dramatic "partial transfer" tended to be used in Germany and Austria, in which a thin layer of the original wood was retained, and glued onto a new panel.
