= DMPL =

DMPL, or Digital Microprocessor Plotter Language, is a vector graphics file format from Houston Instruments developed to control pen plotters and later used on cutting plotters.

== Driver ==
This language is not compatible with HP-GL, see its EAGLE definition:

[HIDMP]
Type     = PenPlotter
Long     = "Houston Instrument DMP plotter"
Init     = ";:H A EC1 \n"
Reset    = "P0 @\n"
Width    = 16
Height   = 11
ResX     = 1000
ResY     = 1000
PenSelect  = "P%u\n"
PenSpeed   = "V%1.0f\n"
Move       = "U %d,%d\n"
Draw       = "D %d,%d\n"
PenCircleCxCyRxRy = "CA %d,%d 360\n"

== See also ==
- Roland DXY-800, a commonly used plotter for EDA software utilizing yet another plotter language called DXY-GL.
