= Lining of paintings =

Process of conservation science

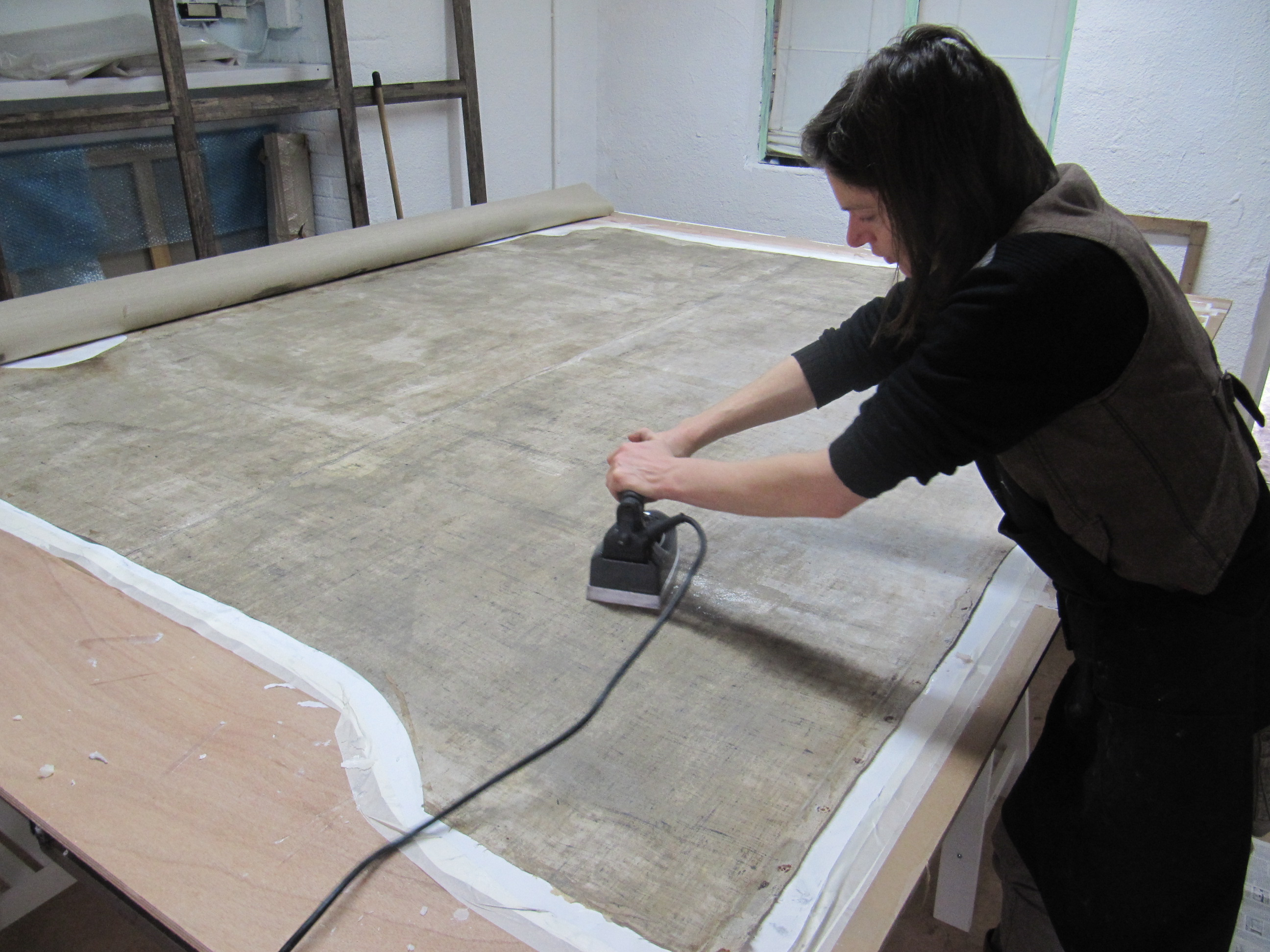
painting relining

The lining of paintings is a process of conservation science and art restoration used to strengthen, flatten or consolidate oil or tempera paintings on canvas by attaching a new support to the back of the existing one. The process is sometimes referred to as relining. Most often a new support will be added directly to the back of an existing canvas. In cases of extreme decay, however, the original canvas may be completely removed and replaced. The height of the practice's use peaked in the late 19th century and in the following years its usefulness has been debated. There are many different factors that influence whether lining a painting will be successful. By paying close attention to an artwork's condition and response to treatment, conservation professionals better understand the lining process and when to apply it.

== Purpose ==
The purpose of lining a painting is to mitigate or revert wear caused by agents of deterioration by strengthening or spreading the tensile load of the artwork's canvas. In the nineteenth century, lining was seen as a preventive practice used to ensure the longevity of a painting, even if the painting did not exhibit any signs of structural damage at the time of treatment. Some painters had their works lined immediately after, or even before, completion. The treatment was intended to mitigate mechanical damage and some nineteenth century academics considered it a necessary step before any other treatments should be enacted. This treatment was considered an inevitable task in the conservation of paintings.

There have been some doubts concerning lining's benefits more recently, especially since the Greenwich Comparative Lining Conference of 1974. Attitudes in the conservation world at large have shifted towards minimal intervention and concerns have been raised about the reversibility of lining paintings. As a result, the criteria for lining a painting is much more limited than it was previously. The main reason for lining a painting today is to strengthen a torn or otherwise weakened canvas to stabilize its condition. Alternative treatments are favored in the majority of circumstances where lining was previously used. Former criteria include: reducing physical deterioration, minimizing mechanical damage, and improving the legibility of the image.

== Agents of deterioration ==
The Canadian Conservation Institute lists ten agents of deterioration that play a role in damaging an object or work of art. While all of these agents play a role in damaging a painting over its lifetime, five primary agents are involved in the degradation of an artwork's canvas and its pigment layers. The decision to reline a piece of art may be made if any number of agents of deterioration have caused excessive damage over time.

=== Physical forces ===
Physical forces are an agent of deterioration that may come from a number of different sources. Impacts, shocks, and abrasions all can damage an object depending on their severity. This type of damage may come from natural events, transportation, or improper handling. Sudden movement, intense vibrations, and jolts to the artwork may cause cracks to any of its layers, tears to the canvas support, or cleavage separating the paint from its canvas.

=== Incorrect temperature and humidity ===
The most common damage to an artwork's canvas is caused by temperature and humidity fluctuations. This agent of deterioration is generally caused by improper storage and exhibition of an artwork. When this type of damage occurs, the artwork may exhibit uneven expansion and contraction of pigment materials relative to their canvas backing due to their chemical compositions. If the paint layer is brittle or old, the changes in size at varying rates will result in cracks or tears.

=== Pests ===
Depending on the environment and location in which a painting is kept, it may attract a variety of different types of pests that may be harmful to its canvas support. Rodents and insects that consume fabric pose the most risk and may cause tears and punctures. Pests may damage individual portions of the artwork or the entire piece of art.

=== Water damage ===
Water damage may result in mold formations, a type of pest damage, on the canvas and pigment layers. It may also cause the canvas or framing supports to weaken and become flimsy resulting in tears from physical forces. Ripples, waves, and undulations are also a common form of water damage. While water damage is dangerous to an artwork, it is not as common as other agents of deterioration.

== Previous methodologies ==
=== Canvas removal ===
The procedure as carried out in the 19th century is described by Theodore Henry Fielding in his Knowledge and Restoration of Old Paintings (1847). The first step taken to reline a painting was stripping the original canvas from the back of the work. If the painting's deterioration was such that a conservator suggests relining, it had to be determined whether the canvas was in need of reinforcement or if it must be removed entirely. This would determine the scope of the relining process further down the line. In order to begin, the artwork was removed from its frame. Afterwards it was to be laid picture side up, with the image covered by a sheet of paper coated in paste (generally of a beeswax or glue base). The artwork would then be flipped over and secured to the work surface with pins or nails. The current canvas would then be trimmed down or removed entirely so that a new, larger one may be applied.

If the painting was in a state that did not necessitate an entirely new canvas, the conservator or restoration specialist would move on to the step of adhesive application. If the work was so deteriorated that this was not possible, what remained of the canvas needed to be removed without causing further damage to the artwork. By using a fine-toothed comb and pumice stone, the decayed canvas would be gently scraped away revealing the ground on which the image was painted.

=== Adhesive application ===
Once the canvas was properly removed, the professional may begin applying an adhesive to secure the newly selected lining material to the original canvas. Fielding notes that a number of different types of adhesives may be used in this process. Glue paste, beeswax, strong copal varnish, or a glue made from pounded cheese are all listed as acceptable materials to coat the back of the artwork with. The main benefits of a pounded cheese-based paste is its water-resistance. Once the artwork had been coated in its entirety, a new lining material may be pressed into the adhesive followed by a drying period.

=== Final lining ===
The new lining canvas was pressed down onto the back of the picture by hand; then the outer edges of the lining cloth were fastened to the table by means of a large number of tacks, and a piece of wood with a rounded edge was passed over the back of the cloth, to ensure perfect adhesion. When the glue had dried sufficiently, the lining was smoothed with a moderately hot iron. Fielding cautions that "the greatest care must be taken that the hand does not stop for an instant, or the mark of the iron will be so impressed on the painting, that nothing can obliterate it." The picture was then nailed to a new stretcher, and the paper was washed off with a sponge and cold water.

The use of hand-ironing is liable to produce a flattening of impasto. This problem was mitigated by the introduction in the 1950s of vacuum hot-table processes, designed for use with wax-resin adhesives, which exerted a more even pressure on the paint surface; however the longer periods of heating and high temperatures involved often led to other types of textural alteration.

== Current methodologies ==
Currently, minimalist approaches are favored over invasive treatments. The minimalist approach to the conservation of paintings involves mitigating structural changes in loose linings, backboard, and frame glazing. These methods involve controlling environmental conditions in order to slow physical deterioration.

Lining an entire painting has largely fallen out of favor due to the invasive nature of the treatment. Minimalist intervention emphasizes the maintenance of the original integrity of a painting, so long as it is able to be displayed and the image is not disrupted. However, patches are sometimes applied to strengthen specific areas of a canvas. Strip linings can be added to reinforce the margins of a painting. This practice is important as the margins of a painting are often more damaged than the rest of the canvas. Strip linings strengthen the edges of the canvas so that they can withstand re-stretching. Both strip lining and patching are less invasive than lining. Another method used in place of lining is loose-lining. Loose-lining is accomplished by stretching a painted image over polyester sailcloth without adhesive between the fabrics. This technique helps protect the painting from atmospheric pollution, but does not flatten or consolidate the paint surface. The polyester lining supports the weight of the painted canvas and as a result, the canvas does not require to be stretched as tightly. Paintings that are given a loose-lining can remain on their original stretchers, maintaining structural and historic integrity.

=== Lining materials ===
Traditional linen fabrics and synthetic polyester are the most dominant fabrics used for lining; cotton is also sometimes used. Although experiments with synthetic fabrics have been carried out since the 1960s, linen cloths are still frequently used for lining because they maintain the aesthetics of traditional painting. Cotton or polyester canvas, however, is often used for both strip lining and loose-lining. Polyester is favored for strip lining as it is thin, durable, and load-bearing. When paired with a flexible adhesive such as BEVA 371, polyester strip linings cause less deformation of the painting plane. Polyester sailcloth is favored specifically because it is stiff, resists degradation, and can withstand a greater tensile load than linen. There are cases of fiberglass cloth used in treating a painting with BEVA 371. In general, more importance is placed on the stiffness of lining fabrics as stiff adhesives that impregnate the canvas are no longer popular due to their permanent alteration of the original canvas. While the synthetic fabrics currently in use do not share aesthetic qualities of linen, there is currently development of linen-look synthetic fabrics.

== Adhesives and their uses ==
Wax-based adhesives seem to have been in use for lining from the 18th century, although the earliest well-documented case of their employment is in the lining of Rembrandt's Night Watch in 1851. Although, initially, pure beeswax was used, mixtures incorporating resins such as dammar and mastic, or balsams such as Venice turpentine, were soon found preferable. During the 20th century, it came to be realised that the impregnation of the paint layer with wax could have deleterious effects, including darkening of the picture, especially where canvas or ground were exposed.

The most commonly used adhesive material in the modern day is a compound known as BEVA 371. According to a survey conducted by Joyce Hill Stoner that gauged the use of different lining treatments, ninety percent of conservators who responded indicated they used BEVA 371. BEVA is a synthetic resin-wax mixture that is available as either a gel or a dry film. The compound is dissolved in hydrocarbon-based solvents which are known to be harmless to paintings pigment layers It requires a heatlining treatment that exceeds other adhesive agents' temperature and treatment length, which has necessitated the development of new techniques, such as such as "flock lining" and "drop lining". Despite the increased temperature and length of the lining treatment, BEVA 371 is applied to the painting cold, and is melted to the canvas support with heat to adhere the additional support to the damaged canvas. The inventor of the compound, Gustav Berger, notes that this treatment may be performed days after the compound's application on account of its solid nature at room temperature. BEVA 371 is also easily reversible with heat treatment, allowing conservators to easily follow a policy of minimal intervention.

== History ==
Prior to the 1974 Comparative Lining Conference, the lining of paintings was a universal practice. 19th century liners undertook the practice in order to strengthen canvasses and potentially prevent future damage. This was achieved by introducing extremely rigid supports to paintings. These rigid supports consisted of thick layers of animal glue and sometimes two lining canvasses. While this treatment could prevent mechanical damage, it would not hold up against drastic climatic change. Beginning in the mid-nineteenth century, wax-resin lining was introduced in an effort to offer protection over a wider range of humidity. Wax-resin lining would remain ubiquitous through the first half of the 20th century as it was viewed as a preservative practice with little negative consequence. Some practitioners began expressing doubts as a result of observed damage on lined paintings which lead to the 1974 Comparative Lining Conference.

The 1974 Comparative Lining Conference involved specialists in the lining of painting from around the world. This conference provided the opportunity for the methods of lining paintings to be scrutinized for the first time. Ultimately, no consensus was reached amongst the specialists and a moratorium was called on the practice until further research could be conducted. Overarching shifts in conservation philosophy towards minimal intervention have contributed greatly to the decline in lining paintings. Today, lining is considered an unfavorable treatment only to be used when absolutely necessary. Alternative, less invasive, treatments are pursued instead. These treatments include flattening, consolidation, strip lining, tear repair, and loose lining.

== Controversies and modern research ==
There are many points of controversy that surround the process of relining a painting. While Fielding's discussion of the conservation techniques is well-detailed, with many of the same techniques still used to this day, research has informed conservators on different approaches and materials to use. Debates around the lining of paintings have been recorded as far back as the end of the 18th century, with outcry denouncing the Louvre and the National Gallery. In the late 20th century, scholars such as Percival-Prescot suggested the use of nonlining alternatives signaling a transition in conservation approaches

=== Minimal intervention ===
One of the most important debates surrounding the lining of paintings discusses the process's necessity in the first place. Modern changes to interventive policies in the 1970's and onwards have spurred conservation specialists to maintain works of art and their original materials when possible. In his work detailing the changes in lining techniques, Paul Ackroyd notes that "lining is no longer considered as an inevitable occurrence and is a less favored option". In the climate of minimal intervention, there is a consensus that professionals focus on mitigative collection management by controlling environmental factors that lead to deterioration in the first place. In a small survey conducted by Joyce Hill Stoner, ninety percent of conservators selected against relining an artwork with smaller scale interventions being the second most popular choice.

=== Delining ===
In some cases the relining process must be reverted. Oftentimes this is caused by adhesive agents or lining materials interacting negatively with the original work, causing further damage. The work may also need conservative attention from a different angle, which would necessitate reverting any past restoration The delining process is noted to oftentimes be laborious and may inadvertently cause more damage to the work. In the case of resin or wax-based adhesives, each layer must be gently scraped away to reveal the original pigment layers. A solvent solution may also be used in order to remove extremely difficult or damaged adhesive. The removal process may cause warping or undulations of the painting that were not previously visible. There is controversy to whether these processes inadvertently cause more damage to the artwork. The challenge remains whether to let the painting degrade more or intervene in order to mitigate future damage. This issue leads back into the discussion of minimal interventive policy.

=== Ironing ===
A major change has occurred in the use of hand irons to seal the final lining process. In the case of wax-resin adhesives, vacuum tables with temperature control functions are able to uniformly apply conditions of heat and pressure across the surface of an artwork, reducing the liability of damage in the hand-ironing process. Unfortunately, these tables also render the artwork subject to high pressure and heat leading to a different type of textural change that is equally as disruptive. Since the 1960's professional conservators have agreed that the negatives of this process do not merit its use. Ironing has, however, informed new techniques across the field - most importantly the use of BEVA 371 with heatlining and Plextol B500 with coldlining

=== Adhesive agents ===
Stoner's survey on conservators' use of adhesive agents shows that thirty one out of thirty two professionals use BEVA 371 as their lining adhesive. Sixty two percent of these conservators used wax-based adhesives only when necessary. While the data set is fairly small, this is emblematic of a stark shift in attitude across the twentieth century. Fielding's notes on the use of glue and cheese based adhesives are rarely, if ever, still in use by conservators to this day. Even though BEVA 371 is one of the primary adhesive agents used today, it still has its own issues and there have been efforts to remedy the shortcomings of different lining materials. Despite the acceptance of minimal intervention, relining still exists as a conservation technique and research is conducted in order to better its results. Tests have been conducted in order to see different adhesive agents resistance to damage from physical forces such as punctures and frictions. Mohie et al.'s experiment tested control groups of traditional lining materials against a polyeurethane compound. Following a structural analysis of the data results, a previously restored painting was relined with this new material. The previous conservation efforts were safely removed and the back of the artwork was secured to a workspace. the new cotton support was then adhered and left to airdry with no need for heat sealing. The results of this experiment show promise for the use of polyeurethane as a lining material that resists damage from physical forces, however tests have not been conducted on its ability to expand and contract with environmental temperature changes.
