= Man Mocked by Two Women =

Painting by Francisco de Goya

- Dos mujeres riéndose de un hombre (Spanish)
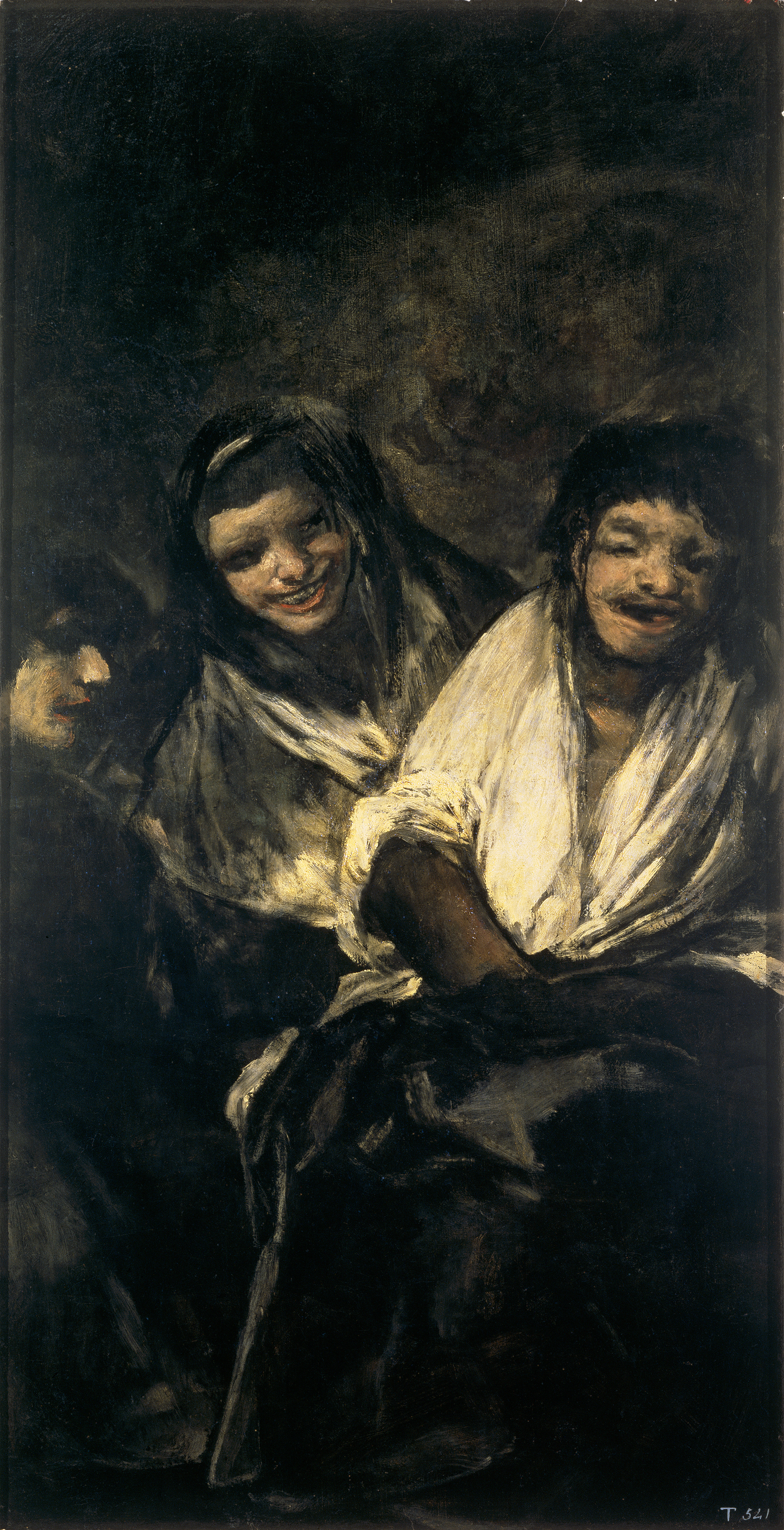
- Artist: Francisco Goya
- Year: c. 1820–1823
- Medium: Oil on plaster transferred to linen
- Dimensions: 125.4 cm × 65.4 cm (49.4 in × 25.7 in)
- Location: Museo del Prado, Madrid

Man Mocked by Two Women or Women Laughing (Spanish: Dos mujeres y un hombre [English:Two Women and a Man]) or The Ministration are names given to a painting by the Spanish artist Francisco Goya, probably completed between 1820 and 1823.

It is one of Goya's 14 Black Paintings, a series painted directly onto the walls of his home, Quinta del Sordo, near the end of his life. He was then living in despair, and the works are oppressively dark in both mood and colour. It shows two women with maniacal smiles seemingly laughing at a simple-minded man who appears to be masturbating at the right hand of the picture. Despite their jeers, the woman to the left may also be masturbating, which—in the absence of any written or oral comment from Goya on any work in the series—art critics and historians believe lends to the image's futile and sterile intent.

Having been removed from the walls of his house, the Black Paintings are now in the Museo del Prado, Madrid.

== Background ==
At the age of 75, living alone and in mental and physical despair, he completed the work as one of his 14 Black Paintings, his final major series, which were executed in oil directly onto the plaster walls of the house he was living in outside Madrid. Goya did not intend for any of these paintings to be seen by others; they were executed during an intense period of physical, mental and political disillusionment, and he never spoke or wrote about them. Although today they are considered amongst the most important works of his output, it was not until some 50 years after his death, around 1874, that they were taken down and transferred to canvas support.

== Description ==
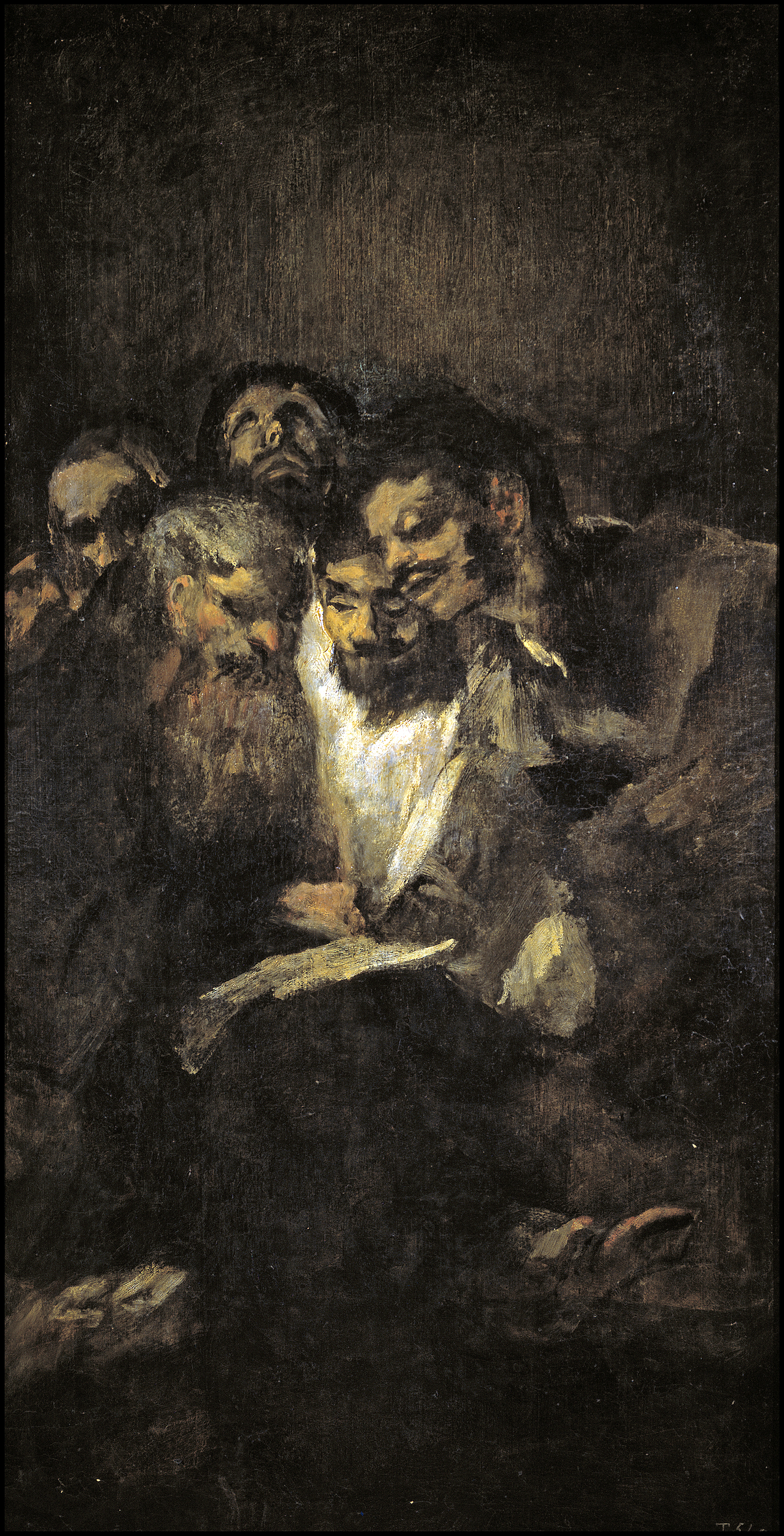
Men Reading is often seen as a companion work, a male counterpart to the feminine Two Women, and can be seen with equal likelihood in terms of group caught in the act of masturbation; in this instance massaging their collective egoes.

The work shows three figures, generally thought to be two witch-like women and one man, huddled together against a black background and lit from the front left. The intended meaning of the work is highly obscure. The background is devoid of setting or detail, and no context is given as to who these people might be, what they are captured doing, or where the scene is set. The figure at right, facing the viewer, is generally presumed to be male. His hands are around his crotch; he appears to be either masturbating, exposing his genitalia or is mentally disturbed. According to art critic Fred Licht, "The sickly grin of his face certainly seems indicative of some sort of sexual compulsion".

The two women are likely prostitutes. They leer with mocking expressions and broad, sinister smiles at the male figure. Some critics have speculated that the lower, concealed portion of the canvas hides the fact that the woman on the far left is also masturbating. Support for this view draws from the strange smiles and expressions on both women's faces, which are as grotesque as the man's. According to Licht, "there may be an element of self-mockery in this painting, some equation between the ironic loneliness of the exhibitionist (whose aim of attracting people is constantly thwarted by the means he obsessively adopts to capture attention) and the artist who also bares himself without shame or restraint and who is also doomed to being railed at as an aberration."

Like most of the other works in the series, X-ray shows that the canvas was repainted and reworked before the final version was settled on. The position of the foremost figure's hand changed, and it is possible that the two female figures were, in an early version, shown reading a book resting on a man's knees. Licht notes this contradictory approach to sexuality in many of Goya's works; while he was unflinching and realistic "to the point of crass" in depicting humanity as it actually is, he was often coy, reserved, and almost prudish in depicting sexual scenes, usually hiding or obscuring genitals, even in his depictions of naked male flayed figures in his The Disasters of War etchings.

Although the 14 paintings in the series are not linked thematically, they share characteristics. They are all predominantly dark; Goya began each with a thick overlay of black paint on top of which he etched the figures with lighter shades of whites, grays, blues and green. As with the current work, they are painted with broad slashing brush strokes. And as with this work, each has at the center what Robert Hughes describes as "a gaping hole...[a] gaping void" – the subject's open mouth. Women Laughing is often seen as a companion piece to Men Reading; both are vertical rather than horizontal and smaller in scale than the other works. Both are thematically less dark than the other works in the series, although they are chromatically darker.

According to the c. 1828–1830 inventory of Goya's friend, Antonio Brugada, Women Laughing was situated opposite Men Reading on the smaller walls of the upper floor of the Quinta. Today it is in the Museo del Prado, Madrid.

== Bibliography ==
- Connell, Evan S. Francisco Goya: A Life. New York: Counterpoint, 2004. ISBN 1-58243-307-0
- Junquera, Juan José. The Black Paintings of Goya. London: Scala Publishers, 2008. ISBN 1-85759-273-5
- Hagen, Rose-Marie & Hagen, Rainer. Francisco Goya, 1746–1828. Taschen, 2003. ISBN 3-8228-1823-2
- Hughes, Robert. Goya. New York: Alfred A. Knopf, 2004. ISBN 0-394-58028-1
- Licht, Fred. Goya: The Origins of the Modern temper in Art. Universe Books, 1979. ISBN 0-87663-294-0
