= HP 7470 =

Desktop pen plotter

The HP 7470 was a small low-cost desktop pen plotter introduced by Hewlett-Packard's San Diego division in 1982. It was the first small-format plot that moved the paper, rather than the pens. It used a revolutionary "grit wheel" design which moved the paper held in place by a wheel with embedded grit and a pinch roller.

The HP 7470 had two pens, one on either side and plotted on ANSI A (8.5 x 11 inch) or A4-sized paper. It was much less expensive than the previous flatbed design. It was very heavy but had 4 pens. The HP 7475 used a rotating carousel with six pens. That plotter was used in greeting card kiosks. This design was also scaled up for very large pen plotters. These were driven by the HP-GL plotter language which used ASCII commands such as PA 300, 4500;PD;. The plotter had three electrical interfaces: HP-IB, RS-232, and HP-IL for HP handheld calculators.

Pen plotters became obsolete with the adoption of ink-jet printers, and processors fast enough to rasterize complex images. Houston Instrument and other manufacturers would follow with similar plotters.
