= Calcomp =

Defunct American computer company

Calcomp Technology
- Type: Public
- Industry: Printers and imaging
- Founded: 1959; 67 years ago in Anaheim, California
- Defunct: 1999
- Fate: Split
- Successor: Don Budde and Don Lightfoot

Calcomp Technology, Inc., often referred to as Calcomp or CalComp, was a company best known for its Calcomp plotters.

== History ==
It was founded as California Computer Products, Inc in 1959, located in Anaheim, California.

Sanders Associates, Inc., purchased Calcomp in 1980. In 1986, Sanders Associates was purchased by the Lockheed Corporation, and merged into Lockheed's Information Systems Group. Lockheed kept CalComp as a brand name.

=== Shutdown ===
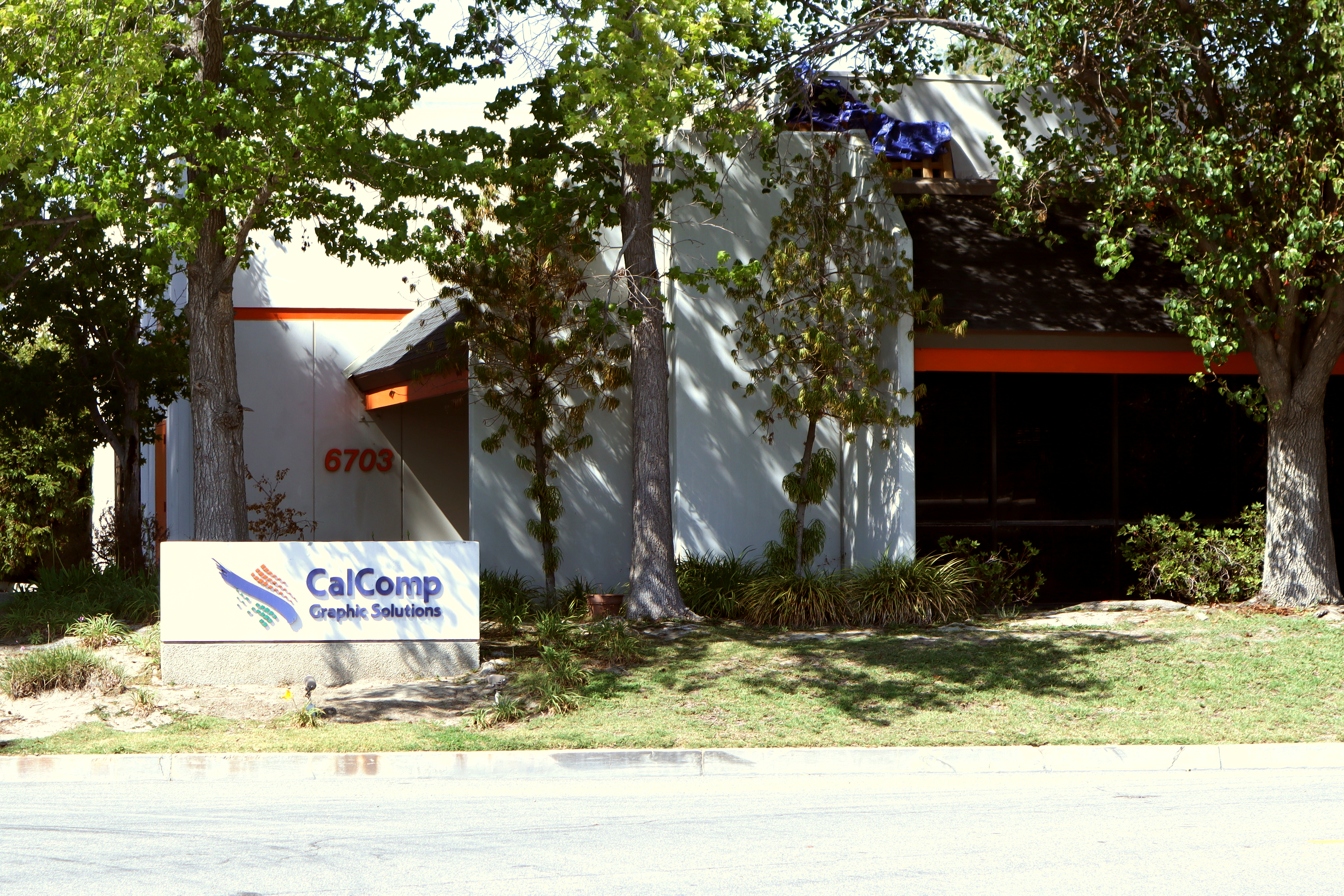
CalComp Graphic Solutions headquarters in Cypress, California.

Calcomp Technology shut down its operations in 1999, and transferred different product lines to various other companies, some of whom continue to use the "Calcomp" or other "Cal-" trademarks:

- Technical Services and spare parts: CalGraph Technology Services, Inc.
- TechJet 5500 Large Format Inkjet Plotter / Printer Information: CalComp Graphics.
- Digitizer, Tablets and scanners: GTCO CalComp, Inc.
- Film Imaging Systems: EcoPro Imaging (now part of OYO Instruments)
- Cutter and sign maker products: Westcomp

=== Products ===
It produced a wide range of plotters (both drum and flat-bed), digitizers, thermal transfer color printers, thermal plotters (InfoWorld June 13, 1994 p. 40) and other graphic input/output devices. In 1969, it produced about 80% of all plotters worldwide.

It also produced IBM plug compatible (PCM) disk and tape products. The disk products ranged from 2311 (CD-1,5, 17, 18, 24, 25) through 3350 equivalents. The tape product was a 3420 equivalent.

Calcomp acquired Talos and Summagraphics, which had acquired Houston Instruments.

== Houston Instruments ==
Houston Instruments was another manufacturer of pen plotters. They used the DMPL plotting control language. They competed with Hewlett Packard plotters such as the HP 7470. They were purchased by Summagraphics.

- DMP-29
- DMP-40, DMP-41, DMP-42
- DMP-50, DMP-51, DMP-51MP, DMP-52, DMP-52MP, DMP-55, DMP-56
- DMP-60, DMP-61, DMP-61DL, DMP-62, DMP-62DL, DMP-63, DMP-64, DMP-65C
- DMP-161, DMP-162, DMP-162R

== Computer division ==
In 1987, CalComp sold its computer division to a company that focuses on CAD/CAM.

== See also ==
- Century Data Systems, data storage division of CalComp
