= Electrostatic plotter =

An electrostatic plotter is a type of plotter that draws images on paper with an electrostatic process. They are most frequently used for Computer-Aided Engineering (CAE), producing raster images via either a liquid toner or a dry toner model.

Liquid toner models use toner that is positively charged and thus becomes attracted to paper's negative charge. This occurs after the toner particles pass through a line of electrodes in the form of tiny wires, or nibs. The spacing of the wires controls the resolution of the plotter; for example, 100 or 400 wires to the inch. Dry toner models use a process similar to xerography in photocopiers. Unlike a laser printer or photocopier, there is no transfer drum used in most electrostatic plotters; the imaging paper is directly exposed to the charging electrode array.

Electrostatic plotters can print in black and white or in color. Some models handle paper sizes up to six feet wide. Newer versions are large-format laser printers and focus light onto a charged drum using lasers or LEDs. The image quality produced by some electrostatic plotters was lower than that of contemporary pen plotters, but the increased speed and economy made them useful. Unlike a pen plotter, the plot time of a rasterized electrostatic plotter was independent of the level of detail of the image. Modern electrostatic color plotters are found in the short run graphics industry, printing on a variety of paper or plastic film surfaces.

Electrostatic plotters were known in the early days of computer graphics; by 1967, several manufacturers commercially supplied electrostatic plotters.
