= Henry Mogford =

British artist (1787–1874)

Henry Mogford FSA (c. 1787 – 9 July 1874) was an English author, picture dealer, artist, and antiquary. He is best known for his campaign against a group of copyists producing forged works attributed to Canaletto near Richmond Bridge, later referred to as the "Canaletti Manufactory."

== Early life ==
Henry Mogford was born to Henry and Sarah Mogford and was christened in 1787 at St Martin-in-the-Fields, London. One of eight children, he grew up in Craven Street near The Strand, where he later lived and worked. Mogford initially trained as an artist before becoming a restorer and dealer in Old Master paintings.

In 1816 Mogford married Margaret Otridge (15 July 1793 – 24 July 1871). The couple had two children: a daughter, Margaret Amelia, born in 1819, and a son, John, born in 1821. Both children were similarly baptised at St Martin-in-the-Fields. John Mogford would go on to establish himself as a landscape, coastal, and figure painter.

== Career ==
During the 1840s, Mogford contributed to the Art-Union, later the Art-Journal, a monthly periodical of fine art. As an international correspondent, his writings focused particularly on the Belgian, Dutch, and French schools of painting. In 1845 he published his Handbook for the Preservation of Pictures, a practical guide to the cleaning, lining, repair, and restoration of canvas paintings. Here, Mogford criticised the common practice of cleaning canvases with water, recommending instead that they first be cleaned with a diluted solution of ox gall.

Mogford's illustration of Ham House, Surrey, was included by Samuel Carter Hall in the 1848 book The Baronial Halls, a collection of coloured lithotints depicting England's "picturesque edifices." The illustration is one of his few surviving works.

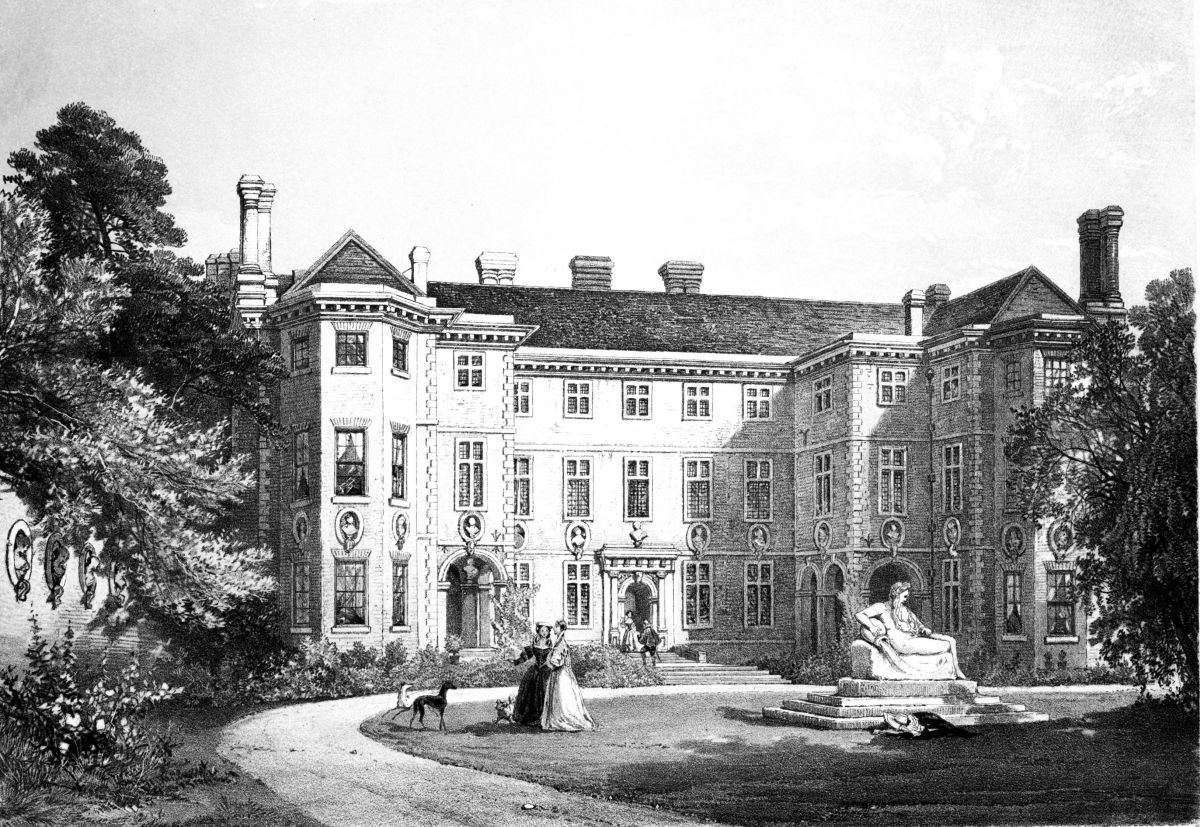
Lithograph of Ham House, from Samuel Carter Hall's 'The Baronial Halls' (1848)

As part of his journalistic career, Mogford supplied the Art-Journal with reports concerning a house near Richmond Bridge, where forgers allegedly "smoked" counterfeit Canaletto paintings in an oven before placing them in aged frames, prompting what the Art-Journal described as a "war (...) waged against a certain class of picture-dealers."

In 1851, Mogford was appointed secretary by Jean-Baptiste Ossian Verdeau for the General Exhibition of Pictures by the Living Artists of the Schools of All Countries, a display of contemporary art independent of the Great Exhibition. Following the event, an auction was held in which exhibitors from the Great Exhibition were invited to submit works for sale, from which several bronze sculptures were acquired. The venture was deemed largely unsuccessful, with around two-thirds of the artworks remaining unsold.

Between 1851 and 1852, Mogford acted as a picture dealer on behalf of Prince Albert, attempting unsuccessfully to persuade the National Gallery to acquire a collection of early Italian, German, and Netherlandish paintings. The works had formerly belonged to Prince Ludwig Kraft Ernst von Oettingen-Wallerstein, who loaned them to Prince Albert. The loan would not be repaid and the collection would eventually transfer to the National Gallery in 1863.

In 1852 and 1853, Mogford served as the English agent for the triennial Salons in Antwerp and Ghent, liaising between English artists and the Belgian market. Throughout the decade, he continued to pursue various artistic and entrepreneurial endeavours. In 1854, he was employed by Ernest Gambart to serve as secretary of the First Annual Exhibition of the French School. In 1856, he became director of the Crystal Palace Picture Gallery, where he sought to establish a permanent "universal exhibition" with regularly rotating displays. He was replaced in 1858 by Charles Wentworth Wass.

In 1860, as a member of the London and Middlesex Archaeological Society, Mogford presented a paper to the committee titled "Recollections of Westminster", along with a roof panel from the Painted Chamber of Westminster Palace, Exchequer tallies, and fragments of stained glass from the exterior of Henry VII's Chapel, which he donated to the Society's museum.

== Death ==
Mogford died on 9 July 1874 at his residence in Hounslow. At the time of his death, his estate was valued at just under £800.
