= Calcomp plotter =

Computer graphics output device

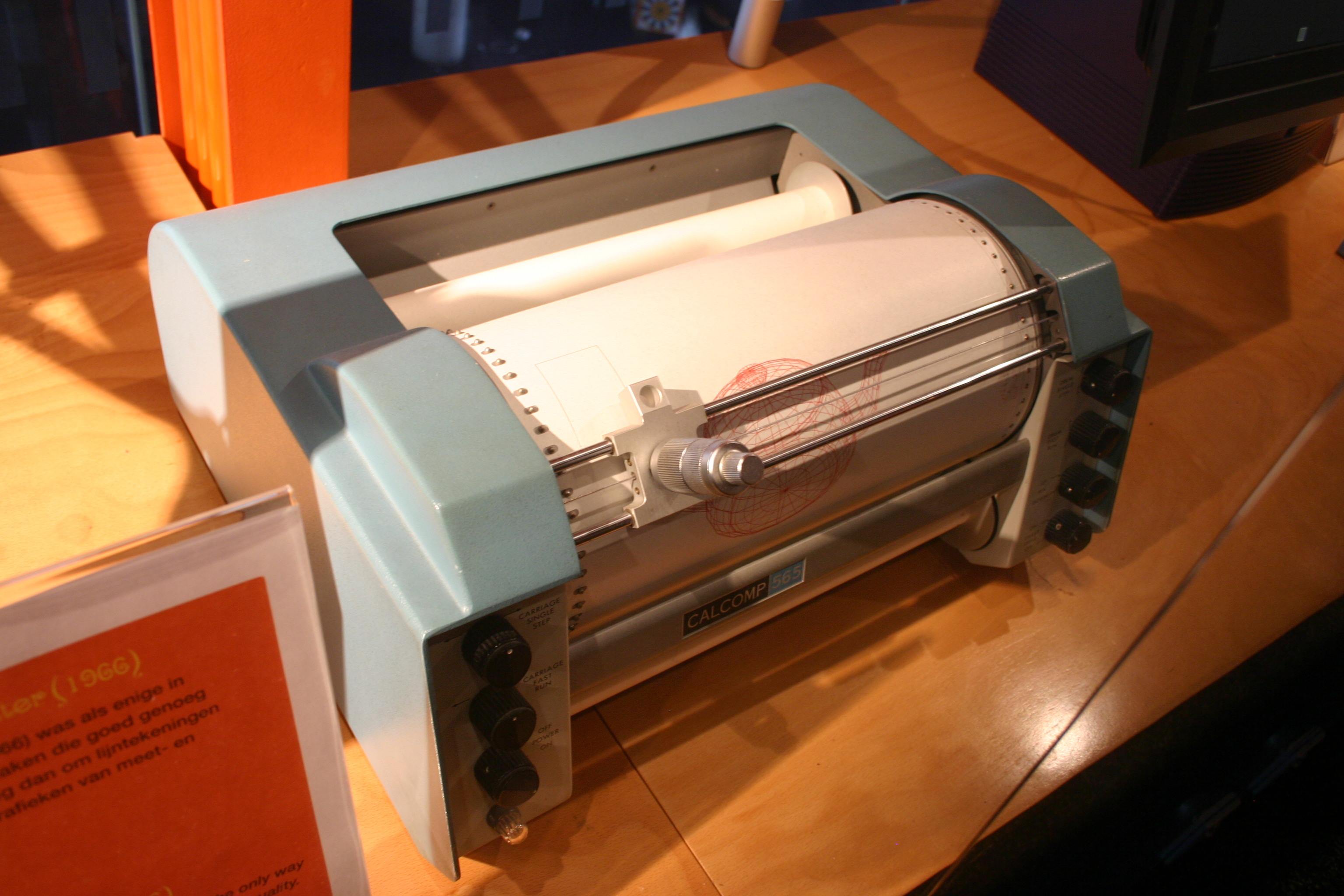
A Calcomp 565 drum plotter

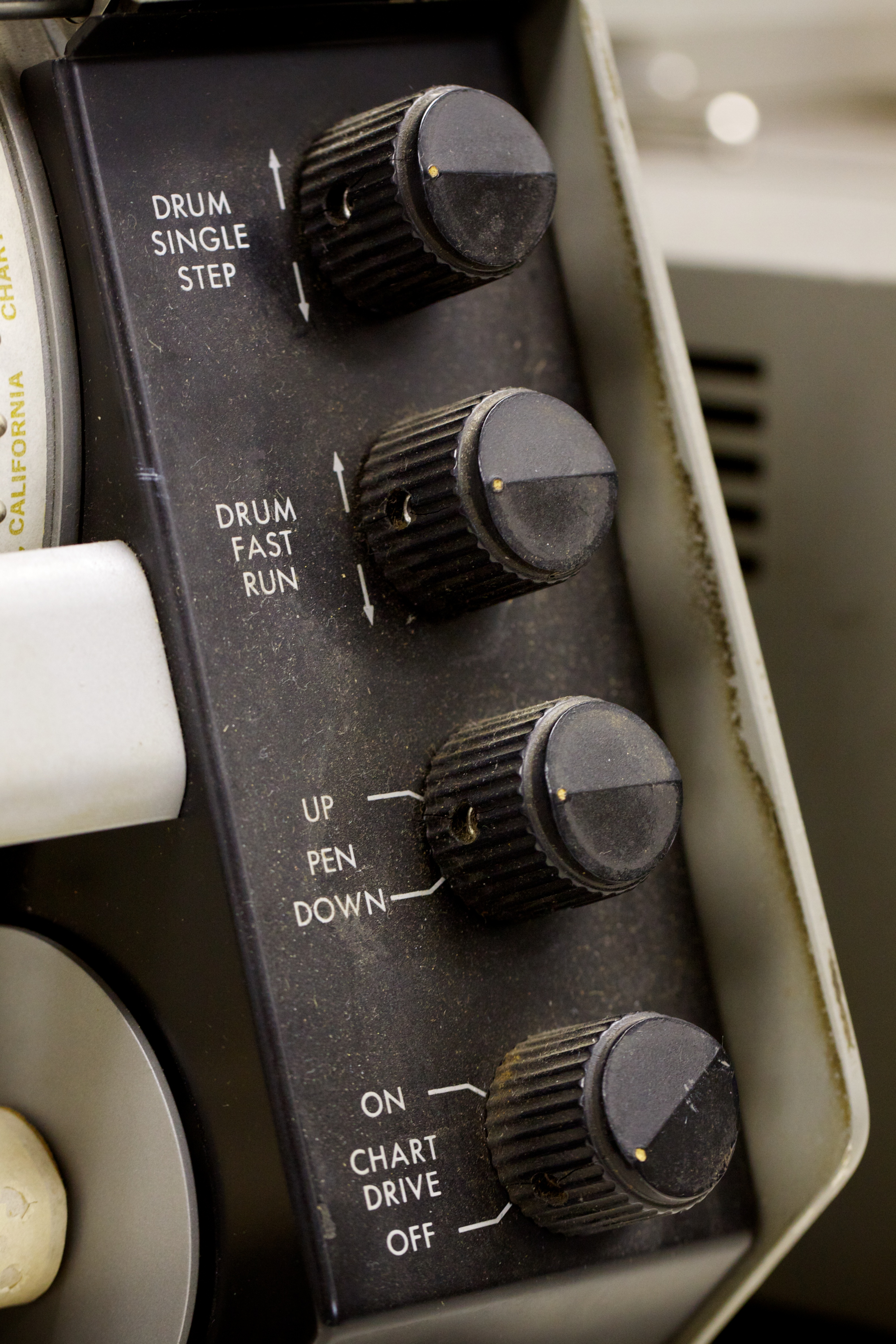
Closeup of Calcomp plotter right side, showing controls for manually moving the drum. Similar controls on the left move the pen carriage.

Calcomp plotters (sometimes referred to as CalComp plotters) were the best known products of the California Computer Products company (Calcomp or CalComp).

== Overview ==
The Calcomp 565 drum plotter, introduced in 1959, was one of the first computer graphics output devices sold. The computer could control in 0.01 inches (0.25 mm) increments the rotation of an 11-inch (280 mm) wide drum, and the horizontal movement of a pen holder over the drum. The pen was pressed by a spring against paper scrolling across the drum. A solenoid could lift the pen off the paper. This arrangement allowed line drawings to be made under computer control. Later, Calcomp manufactured its model 563, which was very similar but had a 30-inch (760 mm) wide drum.

The paper rolls were 120 feet (37 m) long. A metal bar above the take-up reel allowed a finished plot to be torn off and removed. The drum would then be advanced using the manual controls and the fresh paper end taped to the take-up reel. The standard pen was a ball-point, but liquid ink pens were available, and typically were used for higher quality plots intended for publication. Other paper stock could be taped to the drum if desired. A chart drive switch was provided to turn off the motorized paper supply and take-up reels for this purpose.

=== IBM ===
IBM marketed the Calcomp 565 as its IBM 1627 for use with its low-end scientific computers, first the IBM 1620, and, later, the IBM 1130. It was perhaps the first non-IBM peripheral that IBM allowed to be attached to one of its computers.

A Calcomp plotter attached to an IBM 1401 was used to develop Bresenham's line algorithm in 1962.
