= Vacuum table =

System for holding workpieces during machining

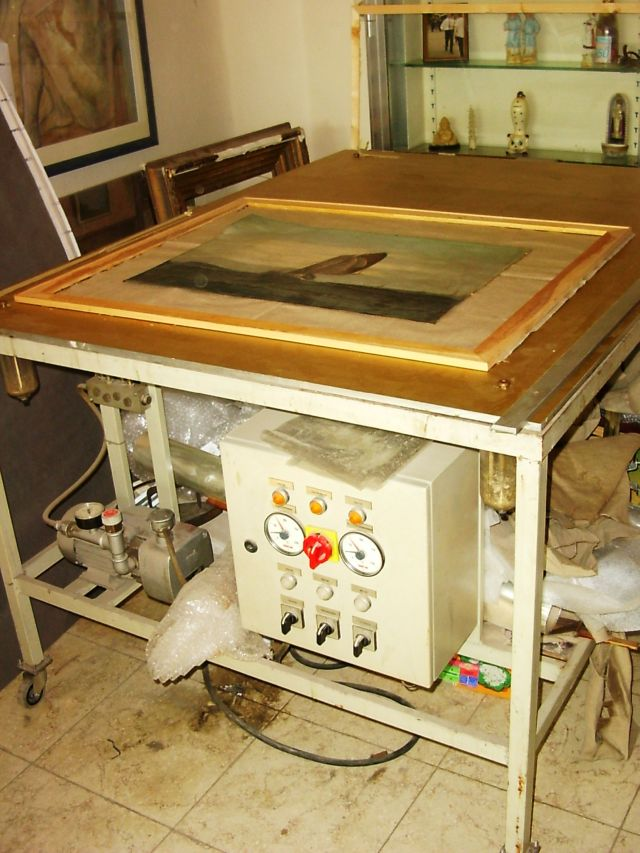
A vacuum table

A vacuum table is a system for holding workpieces during machining. The device consists of a perforated table top containing a vacuum chamber, and a vacuum pump to keep the vacuum chamber below ambient enough pressure. The workpiece is placed on the top of the vacuum chamber and thus held down by the pressure differential between the vacuum chamber and the outside air.

A vacuum table consists of a typically flat rigid surface with small holes to move air from under a workpiece, as to apply varying vacuum from between the desired workpiece and table to maintain a clamping force greater than that needed to machine a part, generally, in a mill, lathe, EDM (Electro-Discharge Machine), pantograph or any other commonly used machine in a machine shop environment.

The main purpose of the vacuum table is to allow full access to all sides of a machined part, except the side in which the part contacts the vacuum table.

A vacuum table is similar to a "Magnetic Clamping Table" in use, typically, to the same end as a vacuum table except instead of vacuum, the magnetic table uses electromagnetic attraction to restrain ferrous materials to the table facilitating ease of access for modern machining. A vacuum table, of course, is not limited to ferrous materials.

The Table works by manipulating atmospheric pressure to provide workpiece force against a surface. This increases static friction against forces of a cutter of various types used today. An atmospheric pressure, up to 29 inHg allows clamping force of approx 14 PSI at sea level.

To use a vacuum table one must place the work upon the table and use air dams around the work to minimize the loss of vacuum to atmospheric pressure. This maximizes force to the work in any attitude that the table may be held, in all axis, that the work may be machined or inspected.

Air dams can be nothing more than masking or packing tape, a flat stock of just about any material, or anything else that can resist the vacuum force sufficient to vacuum applied and thus clamping force. Also, the air dams may provide a closer seal that light vacuum applied to delicate parts can be used.

Air dams are not entirely required in the use of a vacuum table but they can be when the source of vacuum is limited. As a vacuum pump, generally, is designed for high vacuum as opposed to high volume, air dams can be used, again, to increase clamping force. A source for vacuum in some applications may be as simple as a typical shop vac or vacuum cleaner, in a light application. Vacuum pumps are the usual vacuum source.

Vacuum tables are also used in other industries besides machining. In the furniture business, foam cushions can be stuffed more easily when the foam is compressed previously by the use of a table and a surrounding air resistant fabric. Fabric or film wrapped around the foam allows air to be removed thus shrinking the size of the foam "stuffing" substantially. This smaller foam quickly expands once inside the cushion as the foam obtains equilibrium to atmospheric pressure.

== Alternative vacuum table surfaces ==
Scratch prone substrate
The material you are working with may be sensitive to aluminum. To avoid scratching the surface of the material, one must apply a different vacuum table skin. Formica is commonly used as it minimizes any sort of scratches once put on a vacuum table.
High temperature
The temperature that the vacuum table will be exposed to is also a factor that requires addressing. One must make sure a high-temperature epoxy is used in the manufacturing of the vacuum table before it makes contact with hot substrates.
