= History of hard disk drives =

Historical lowest retail price of computer memory and storage

In 1953, IBM recognized the immediate application for what it termed a "Random Access File" having high capacity and rapid random access at a relatively low cost. After considering technologies such as wire matrices, rod arrays, drums, drum arrays, etc., the engineers at IBM's San Jose California laboratory invented the hard disk drive. The disk drive created a new level in the computer data hierarchy, then termed Random Access Storage but today known as secondary storage, less expensive and slower than main memory (then typically drums and later core memory) but faster and more expensive than tape drives.

The commercial usage of hard disk drives (HDD) began in 1957, with the shipment of a production IBM 305 RAMAC system including IBM Model 350 disk storage. US Patent 3,503,060 issued March 24, 1970, and arising from the IBM RAMAC program is generally considered to be the fundamental patent for disk drives.

Each generation of disk drives replaced larger, more sensitive and more cumbersome devices. The earliest drives were usable only in the protected environment of a data center. Later generations progressively reached factories, offices and homes, eventually becoming ubiquitous.

Disk media diameter was initially 24 inches, but over time it has been reduced to today's 3.5-inch and 2.5-inch standard sizes. Drives with the larger 24-inch- and 14-inch-diameter media were typically mounted in standalone boxes (resembling washing machines) or large equipment rack enclosures. Individual drives often required high-current AC power due to the large motors required to spin the large disks. Drives with smaller media generally conformed to de facto standard form factors.

The capacity of hard drives has grown exponentially over time. When hard drives became available for personal computers, they offered 5-megabyte capacity. During the mid-1990s the typical hard disk drive for a PC had a capacity in the range of 500 megabyte to 1 gigabyte. As of February 2025 hard disk drives up to 36 TB were available.

Unit production peaked in 2010 at about 650 million units, and has been in a slow decline since then.

== 1950s–1970s ==
The IBM 350 Disk File was developed under the code-name RAMAC by an IBM San Jose team led by Reynold Johnson. It was announced in 1956 with the then new IBM 305 RAMAC computer. A variant, the IBM 355 Disk File, was simultaneously announced with the IBM RAM 650 computer, an enhancement to the IBM 650.

The IBM 350 drive had fifty 24-inch (0.6 m) platters, with a total capacity of five million 6-bit characters (3.75 megabytes). A single head assembly having two heads was used for access to all the platters, yielding an average access time of just under 1 second.

The RAMAC disk drive created a new level in the computer data hierarchy, today known as secondary storage, less expensive and slower than main memory (then typically core or drum) but faster and more expensive than tape drives. Subsequently, there was a period of about 20 years in which other technologies competed with disks in the secondary storage marketplace, for example tape strips, e.g., NCR CRAM, tape cartridges, e.g., IBM 3850, and drums, e.g., Burroughs B430, UNIVAC FASTRAND, but all ultimately were displaced by HDDs.

The IBM 1301 Disk Storage Unit, announced in 1961, introduced the usage of heads having self-acting air bearings (self-flying heads) with one head per each surface of the disks. It was followed in 1963 by the IBM 1302, with 4 times the capacity.

Also in 1961, Bryant Computer Products introduced its 4000 series disk drives. These massive units stood 52 inches (1.3 m) tall, 70 inches (1.8 m) long, and 70 inches (1.8 m) wide, and had up to 26 platters, each 39 inches (0.99 m) in diameter, rotating at up to 1,200 rpm. Access times were from 50 to 205 milliseconds (ms). The drive's total capacity, depending on the number of platters installed, was up to 205,377,600 bytes (205 MB).

The first disk drive to use removable media was the IBM 1311 drive. It was introduced in 1962 using the IBM 1316 disk pack to store two million characters. It was followed by the IBM 2311 (1964) using the IBM 1316 disk pack to store 5 megabyte, IBM 2314 (1965) using the IBM 2316 disk pack to store 29 megabytes, the IBM 3330 using 3336 disk packs to store 100 megabytes and the 3330-11 using the 3336–11 to store 200 megabytes.

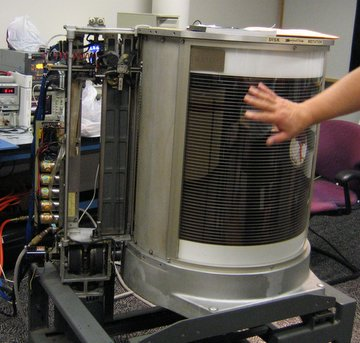
A partially disassembled IBM 350 (RAMAC)

Memorex shipped the first HDD, the Memorex 630, in 1968, plug compatible to an IBM model 2311 marking the beginning of independent competition (Plug Compatible Manufacturers or PCMs) for HDDs attached to IBM systems. It was followed in 1969 by the Memorex 660, an IBM 2314 compatible, which was OEM'ed to DEC and resold as the RP02.

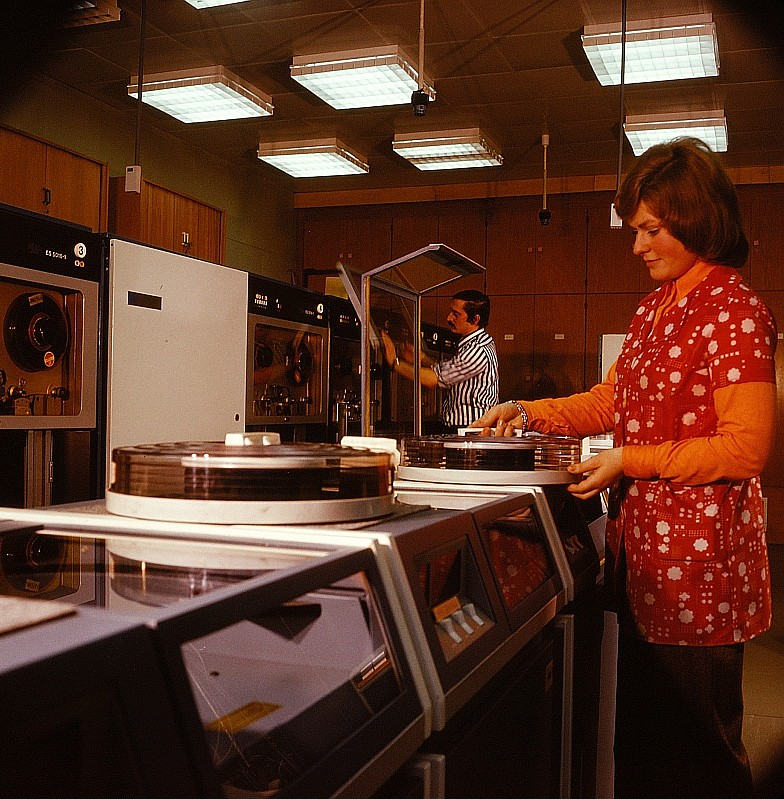
Removable disk packs

In 1964, Burroughs introduced the B-475 disk drive, with a head per track, as part of the B5500.

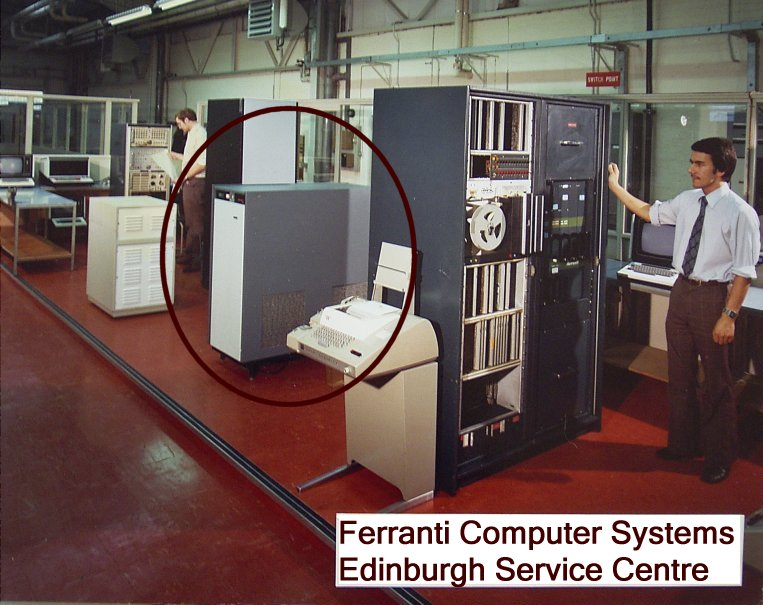
Burroughs B-475 Disk Drive (circled)

In 1970, IBM introduced the 2305 disk drive, with a head per track. In June it introduce the 3330 Direct Access Storage Facility, code-named Merlin. Its removable disk packs could hold 100 MB. A major advance introduced with the 3330 was the use of error correction, which made this and most subsequent drives more reliable and less expensive because small imperfections in the disk surface can be tolerated.

In 1973, Control Data Corporation introduced the first of its series of SMD disk drives using conventional disk pack technology. The SMD family became the predominant disk drive in the minicomputer market into the 1980s.

Also in 1973, IBM introduced the IBM 3340 "Winchester" disk drive and the 3348 data module, the first significant commercial use of low mass and low load heads with lubricated platters and the last IBM disk drive with removable media. This technology and its derivatives remained the standard through 2011. Project head Kenneth Haughton named it after the Winchester 30-30 rifle because it was planned to have two 30 MB spindles; however, the actual product shipped with two spindles for data modules of either 35 MB or 70 MB. The name 'Winchester' and some derivatives are still common in some non-English speaking countries to generally refer to any hard disks (e.g. Hungary, Russia).

In 1975, the "Swinging arm" actuator was introduced by both IBM and StorageTek. The simple design of the IBM 62GV (Gulliver) drive, invented at IBM's UK Hursley Labs, became IBM's most licensed electro-mechanical invention. The swing arm was adopted in the 1980s for all HDDs and is still used nearly 50 years and 10 billion arms later.

Smaller diameter media came into usage during the 1970s and by the end of the decade standard form factors had been established for drives using nominally 8-inch media (e.g., Shugart SA1000) and nominally 5.25-inch media (e.g., Seagate ST-506).

During the 1970s, captive production, dominated by IBM's production for its own use, remained the largest revenue channel for HDDs, though the relative importance of the OEM channel grew. Led by Control Data, Diablo Systems, CalComp and Memorex, the OEM segment reached $631 million in 1979, but still well below the $2.8 billion associated with captive production.

== 1980s, the transition to the PC era ==
The 1980s saw the minicomputer age plateau as PCs were introduced. Manufacturers such as IBM, DEC and Hewlett-Packard continued to manufacture 14-inch hard drive systems as industry demanded higher storage; one such drive is the 1980 2.52 GB IBM 3380. But it was clear that smaller Winchester storage systems were eclipsing large platter hard drives.

In the 1980s 8-inch drives used with some mid-range systems increased from a low of about 30 MB in 1980 to a top-of-the-line 3 GB in 1989.

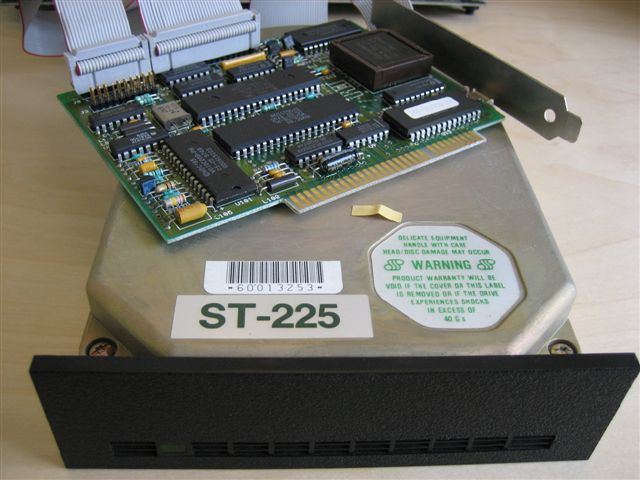
Seagate 20 MB HDD and Western Digital Controller for PC

Hard disk drives for personal computers (PCs) were initially a rare and very expensive optional feature; systems typically had only the less expensive floppy disk drives or even cassette tape drives as both secondary storage and transport media. However, by the late 1980s, hard disk drives were standard on all but the cheapest PC and floppy disks were used almost solely as transport media.

Most hard disk drives in the early 1980s were sold to PC end users by systems integrators such as the Corvus Disk System or the systems manufacturer such as the Apple ProFile. The IBM PC XT in 1983, included an internal standard 10 MB hard disk drive and IBM's version of Xebec's hard disk drive controller, and soon thereafter internal hard disk drives proliferated on personal computers, one popular type was the ST-506/ST-412 hard drive and MFM interface.

HDDs continued to get smaller with the introduction of the 3.5-inch form factor by Rodime in 1983 and the 2.5-inch form factor by PrairieTek in 1988.

Industry participation peaked with about 75 active manufacturers in 1985 and then declined thereafter even though volume continued to climb: by 1989 reaching 22 million units and US$23 billion in revenue.

== 1990s ==
Even though there were a number of new entrants, industry participants continued to decline in total to 15 in 1999. Unit volume and industry revenue monotonically increased during the 1990s to 174 million units and $26 billion.

In the mid-90s, PC Card Type II hard disk drive cards became available. These cards were the first to be 5 mm thick as it is the thickness of a Type II PC Card.

The industry production consolidated around the 3.5-inch and 2.5-inch form factors; the larger form factors dying off while several smaller form factors were offered but achieved limited success, e.g. HP 1.3-inch Kittyhawk, IBM 1-inch Microdrive, etc.

== 2001 to present ==
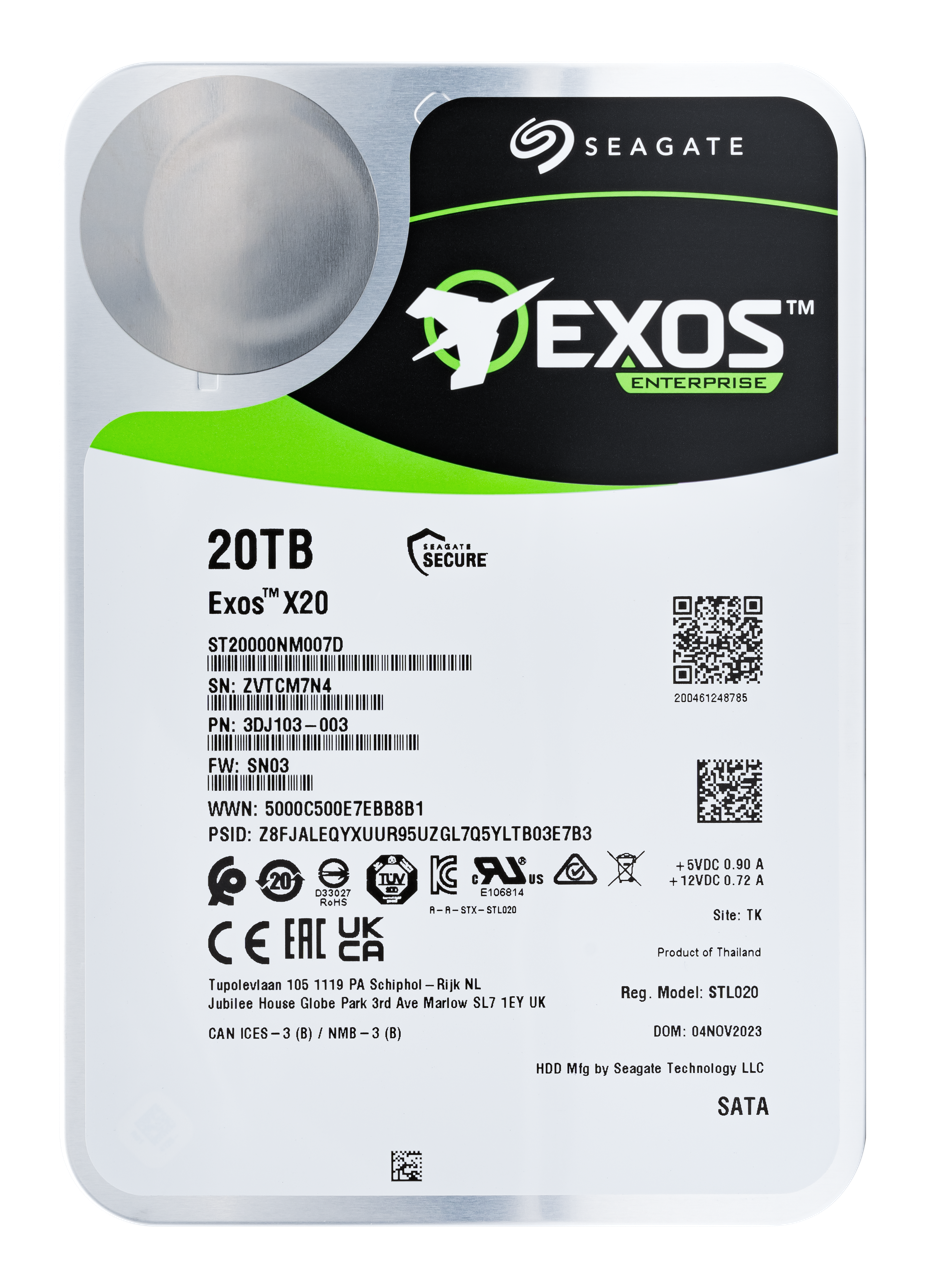
SATA 3½-inch 20TB HDD, released 2022

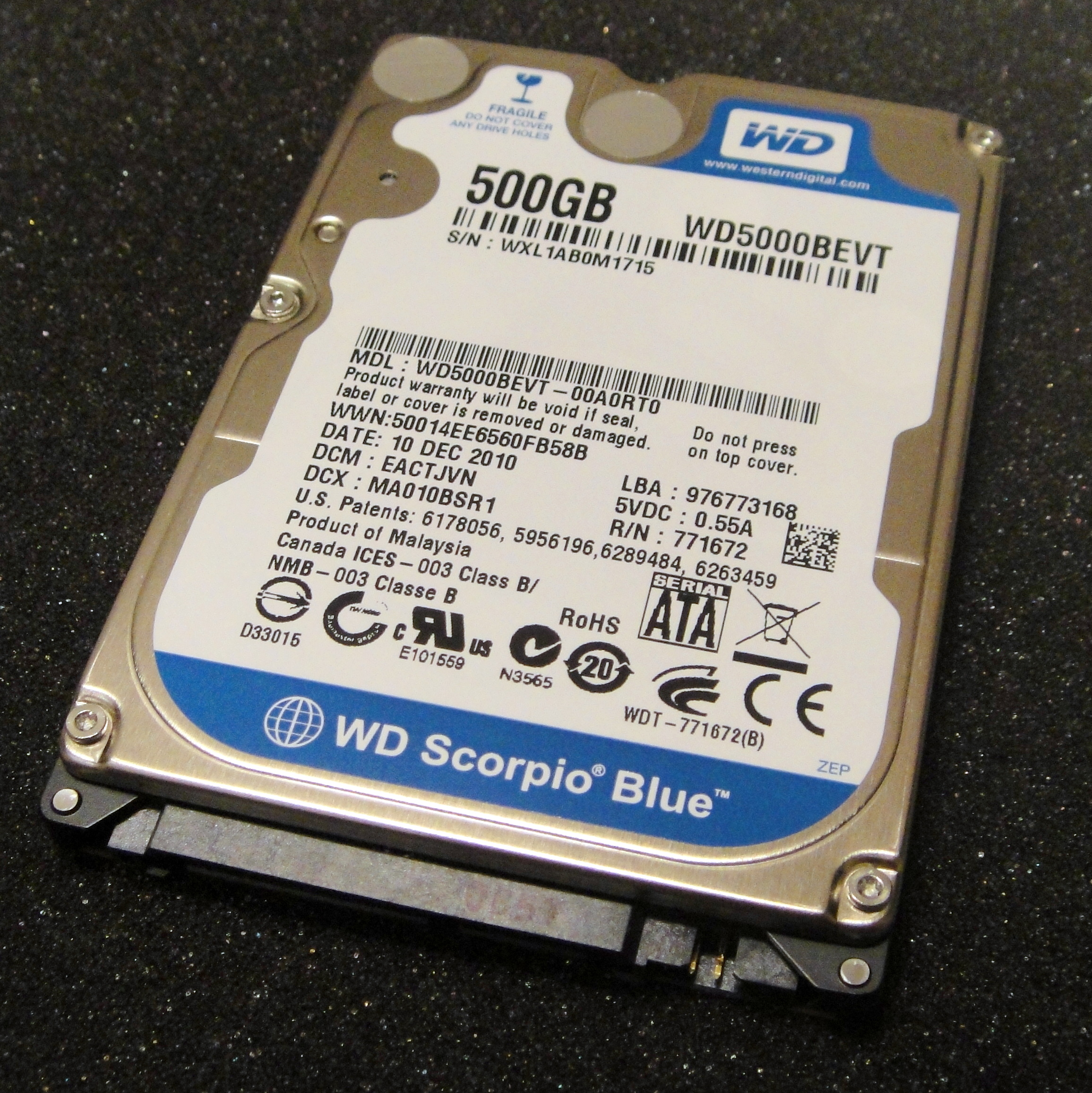
SATA 2½-inch 500GB HDD, circa 2011

In 2001, the HDD industry experienced its first ever decline in units and revenue.

The number of industry participants decreased to six in 2009 and to three in 2013. (See § Manufacturing history for more details)

In 2009 – Fujitsu exits by selling HDD business to Toshiba

In 2011 – Floods hit many hard drive factories. Predictions of a worldwide shortage of hard disk drives cause prices to double.

In 2012, Western Digital announced the first 2.5-inch, 5 mm thick drive, and the first 2.5-inch, 7 mm thick drive with two platters

Unit production peaked in 2010 at about 650 million units. Unit shipment has been in a slow decline since then, shipping about 276 million units in 2018 with a somewhat slower decline projected thereafter.

As of 2020, SSDs have become cheap enough to compete with HDD's at the capacities used by most consumers.

As of March 2026, the largest hard drive is 44 TB (while SSDs can be much bigger at 100 TB, mainstream consumer SSDs cap at 8 TB). Smaller, 2.5-inch drives, are available at up to 2 TB for laptops, and 6 TB as external drives.

== Timeline ==
- 1956 – IBM 350A, shipment of prototype disk drive to Zellerbach, SF CA, USA
- 1957 – IBM 350, first production disk drive, 5 million characters (6-bit), equivalent to 3.75 megabytes.
- 1961 – IBM 1301 Disk Storage Unit introduced with one head per surface and aerodynamic flying heads, 28 million characters (6-bit) per module.
- 1961 – Bryant 4000 (Bryant Computer Products division of Ex-Cell-O) up to 205 MB on up to 26 29-inch diameter platters.
- 1962 – IBM 1311 introduced removable disk packs containing 6 disks, storing 2 million characters per pack
- 1964 – IBM 2311 with 7.25 megabytes per disk pack
- 1964 – IBM 2310 removable cartridge disk drive with 1.02 MB on one disk
- 1965 – IBM 2314 with 11 disks and 29 MB per disk pack
- 1968 – Memorex is first to ship an IBM-plug-compatible disk drive
- 1970 – IBM 3330 Merlin, introduced error correction, 100 MB per disk pack
- 1973 – IBM 3340 Winchester introduced removable sealed disk packs that included head and arm assembly, 35 or 70 MB per pack
- 1973 – CDC SMD announced and shipped, 40 MB disk pack
- 1975 – IBM 62GV Gulliver and STC 8000 introduced the Swinging Arm Actuator, adopted for all HDD in the 1980s.
- 1976 – 1976 IBM 3350 "Madrid" – 317.5 megabytes, eight 14-inch disks, re-introduction of disk drive with fixed disk media
- 1979 – IBM 3370 introduced thin-film heads, 571 MB, non-removable
- 1979 – IBM 0680 Piccolo – 64.5 megabytes, six 8-inch disks, first 8-inch HDD
- 1980 – The NEC N7755 was the first hard disk drive to ship with a capacity exceeding 1 gigabyte (GB) capacity, with 1.27 GB storage.
- 1980 – Seagate releases the first 5.25-inch hard drive, the ST-506; it had a 5-megabyte capacity, weighed 5 pounds (2.3 kilograms), and cost US$1,500
- 1982 – HP 7935 404 megabyte, 7-platter hard drive for minicomputers, HP-IB bus, $27,000
- 1983 – RO351/RO352 first 3 1/2 inch drive released with capacity of 10 megabytes
- 1986 – The Toshiba T3100 was the first laptop computer with built-in laptop hard drive.
- 1986 – Standardization of SCSI
- 1987 – Conner Peripherals ships CP-341, first native IDE drive.
- 1988 – PrairieTek 220 – 20 megabytes, two 2.5-inch disks, first 2.5-inch HDD
- 1989 – Jimmy Zhu and H. Neal Bertram from UCSD proposed exchange decoupled granular microstructure for thin-film disk storage media, still used today.
- 1989 – IDE specified by the Common Access Method (CAM) committee, an ad hoc industry group, as ATA in April 1989.
- 1990 – IBM 0681 "Redwing" – 857 megabytes, twelve 5.25-inch disks. First HDD with PRML Technology (Digital Read Channel with 'partial-response maximum-likelihood' algorithm).
- 1990 – Draft ATA-1 spec submitted to ASC X3T9.2 by Common Access Method (CAM) committee.
- 1990 – The Toshiba MK1122FC (1990) hard drive featured the first hard disk drive platter with glass substrate.
- 1991 – Areal Technology MD-2060 – 60 megabytes, one 2.5-inch disk platter. One of the first commercial hard drives with platter made from glass.
- 1991 – IBM 0663 "Corsair" – 1,004 megabytes, eight 3.5-inch disks; first HDD using magnetoresistive heads
- 1991 – Intégral Peripherals 1820 "Mustang" – 21.4 megabytes, one 1.8-inch disk, first 1.8-inch HDD
- 1992 – HP Kittyhawk – 20 MB, first 1.3-inch hard-disk drive
- 1992 – Seagate ships the first 7,200-rpm hard drive, the Barracuda
- 1993 – ATA-1 spec draft as ANSI X3.221
- 1993 – IBM 3390 model 9, the last Single Large Expensive Disk drive announced by IBM
- 1994 – IBM introduces Laser Textured Landing Zones (LZT)
- 1994 – Maxtor introduces the first 5 mm thick hard drive.
- 1996 – Seagate ships the first 10,000-rpm hard drive, the Cheetah
- 1997 – Toshiba released the first practical hard disk drive equipped with a giant magnetoresistance (GMR) disk read-and-write head.
- 1997 – IBM Deskstar 16 GB "Titan" – 16,800 megabytes, five 3.5-inch disks; one of the first giant magnetoresistance (GMR) heads
- 1997 – Seagate introduces the first hard drive with fluid bearings
- 1997 – Seagate introduces the first 7,200-rpm ATA hard drive, Medalist Pro 6530 and Medalist Pro 9140
- 1998 – UltraDMA/33 and ATAPI standardized
- 1999 – IBM releases the Microdrive in 170 MB and 340 MB capacities
- 2000 – Seagate ships the first 15,000-rpm hard drive, the Cheetah X15
- 2002 – (Parallel) ATA breaks 137 GB (128 GiB) addressing space barrier
- 2002 – Seagate ships the first Serial ATA hard drives
- 2003 – IBM sells disk drive division to Hitachi
- 2004 – MK2001MTN first 0.85-inch drive released by Toshiba with capacity of 2 gigabytes
- 2005 – Serial ATA 3 Gbit/s standardized
- 2005 – Seagate introduces Tunnel MagnetoResistive Read Sensor (TMR) and Thermal Spacing Control
- 2005 – Introduction of faster SAS (Serial Attached SCSI)
- 2005 – First perpendicular magnetic recording (PMR) HDD shipped: Toshiba 1.8-inch 40/80 GB
- 2006 – First 200 GB 2.5-inch hard drive utilizing perpendicular recording (Toshiba)
- 2006 – Samsung announces a hybrid hard drive developed jointly with Microsoft, which has large amounts of flash memory as cache to improve performance, meant as a stopgap between hard drives and solid state drives In 2010, Seagate announced its version of the drive, calling it an SSHD.
- 2007 – Hitachi is the first to offer a 1 TB hard drive in a 3.5 inch form factor.
- 2009 – Western Digital is the first to offer a 1 TB hard drive in a 2.5 inch form factor.
- 2009 – Western Digital ships first HDD with dual stage piezoelectric actuator
- 2010 – Toshiba introduced the first bit-patterned media (BPM) hard drive.
- 2010 – First hard drive manufactured by using the Advanced Format of 4,096‑byte sectors instead of 512‑byte sectors.
- 2011 – Samsung announces 1 TB of capacity per 3.5 inch hard drive platter.
- 2012 – TDK demonstrates 2 TB on a single 3.5-inch platter
- 2012 – WDC acquires HGST operating it as a wholly owned subsidiary. WDC then provides rights to Toshiba, allowing it to re-enter the 3.5-inch desktop hard disk drive market.
- 2013 – HGST ships first modern helium-filled hard disk drive; He6 with 6 TB on 7 platters (announced in 2012).
- 2013 – Seagate claims first to ship shingled magnetic recording (SMR) HDDs
- 2017 – Seagate claims data transfer speeds of 480 MB/s out of a conventional hard drive rotating at 7200 rpm using two independent actuator arms each holding eight read-write heads (two per platter) and announces plans for launch in 2019 under the Mach.2 trademark. This is similar to the read speeds of low-end SSDs (write speed on an SSD is lower than the read speed) Products with this technology were released in 2021.
- 2020 – The first EAMR drive, the Ultrastar HC550, shipped in late 2020.
- 2021 – 20 TB HAMR drives were released by Seagate in January 2021.
- 2021 – Toshiba releases the first FC-MAMR hard drives.
- 2022 – Western Digital and Seagate release HDDs with 10 platters.
- 2024 – Seagate releases the Exos Mozaic 3+ product line with HAMR heads, in sizes up to 32 TB.
- 2025 – Seagate releases a 36 TB variation of the Exos Mozaic 3+ product line HDDs.

== Manufacturing history ==
Diagram of consolidation

Manufacturing began in California's Silicon Valley in 1957 with IBM's production shipment of the first HDD, the IBM RAMAC 350. The industry grew slowly at first with three additional companies in the market by 1964: Anelex, Bryant Computer Products and Data Products. The industry grew rapidly in the late 1960s and again in the 1980s reaching a peak of 75 manufacturers in 1984. There have been at least 221 companies manufacturing hard disk drives but most of that industry has vanished through bankruptcy or mergers and acquisitions. Surviving manufacturers are Seagate, Toshiba and Western Digital (WD) with Toshiba as the senior participant having entered the market in 1977, twenty years after IBM started the market.

From beginning and into the early 1980s manufacturing was mainly by US firms in the United States at locations such as Silicon Valley, Los Angeles, Minnesota and Oklahoma City. In the 1980s US firms, beginning with Seagate, began to shift production to Singapore and then other locations in southeast Asia. In a span of seven years, 1983 to 1990, Singapore became the single largest location of HDD production, amounting to 55% of worldwide production. Japanese HDD companies later also moved their production to southeast Asia. Today the three remaining firms all produce their units in the Pacific Rim.

By the 1990s the dollar value of magnetic recording devices produced by companies located in California's "Silicon Valley" exceeded the dollar value of semiconductor devices produced there leading some to suggest that a more appropriate name for this area would be "Iron Oxide Valley," after the magnetic material coating the disks. All three remaining firms still have significant activities in Silicon Valley, but no HDD manufacturing. Western Digital still manufactures its read-write head wafers in Fremont CA.

== See also ==
- History of the floppy disk
- History of IBM magnetic disk drives
