= HP 7935 =

The HP 7935 is a business computer hard disk drive system manufactured by Hewlett-Packard. It was produced by the Disc Memory Division in Boise, Idaho USA beginning in 1982 at a cost of about $27,000. Within the company the drive was known as the "BFD", ostensibly an acronym for "big fixed disc" but the development engineers had used that acronym for "big fucking disc", a term relative to the smaller 7920 series drives introduced earlier by the company.

== Size ==
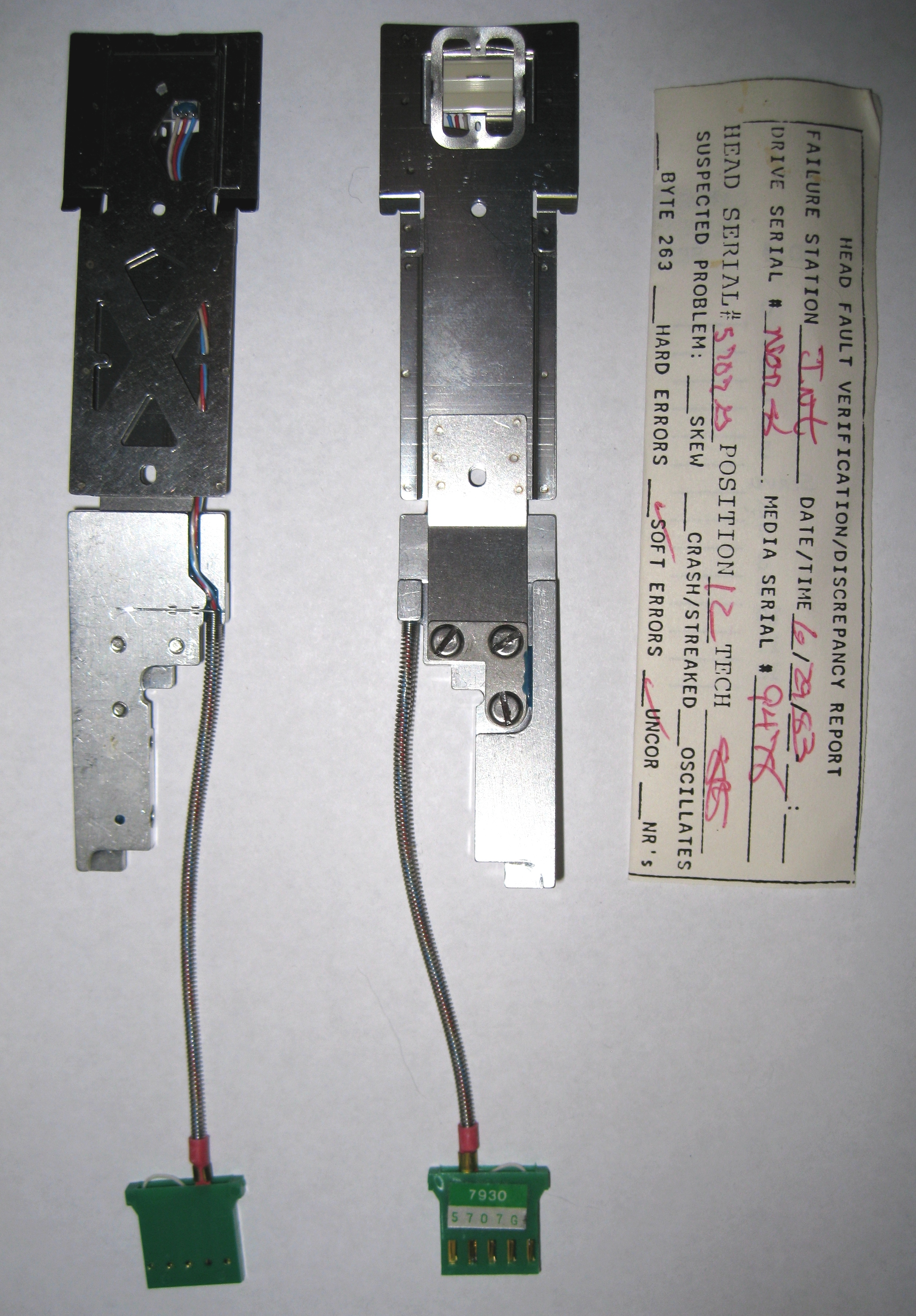
Drive heads from the HP 7935 with assembly reject tag circa 1983

The 7935 had four bottom mounted casters for moving and four lock-down feet for stability in the computer room.

The drive's linear motor was so powerful if the feet were not down, when in operation the drive could literally move about the computer room.

Height: 82.5 cm (32.5 inches), Width: 55.2 cm (21.7 inches), Depth: 83.4 cm (32.8 inches), 154 kg (339.5 lb.)

== Media ==
The HP7935 allowed the user to remove and install a 404 megabyte model 97935 Disc Pack.

The HP7933 was the same basic drive with a disc pack only removable by service personnel.

The 793x series provided a 300% increase in capacity of the HP 7925 at only a slightly increased cost. Performance-wise, the 7935 had a 15-20% performance decrease compared to the 7925. Apparently modifications were made by HP, in a program called the Performance Enhancement Project, raising 7935 performance 15% making it comparable to the older model.

The HP 7935/33 achieved a track density of 625 tracks per inch (considered high at the time), achieving capacity using 7 platters, 13 data surfaces and 14 heads (one head and surface were used for servo data). The disc pack spun at 2694 RPM.

Despite an extensive air purging spin-up sequence to prevent disc and head contamination, human users reportedly caused so many 7935 packs to have disc head crashes, many users simply purchased the 7933.

== Features ==
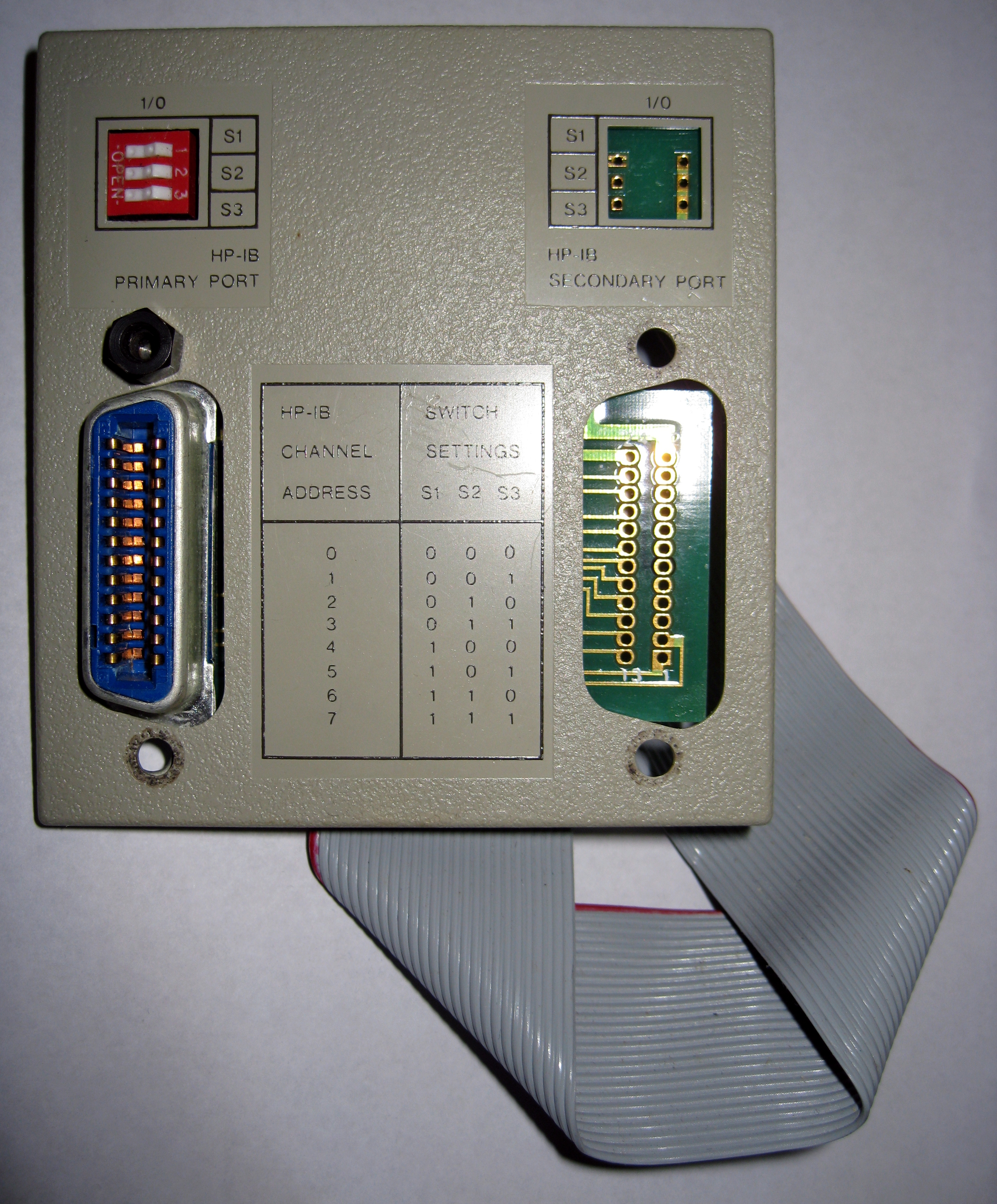
HP 7935 HP-IB Interface

The 7935H had a HP-IB interface mounted in the rear. The drive's front panel had a key pad for running internal disc drive diagnostics, a LED character display, a load and unload button, and a lid opening button.

The 7935G was a bundled package of three 7935H units at a reduced cost of $74,000.

== Use ==
The 7933 and 7935 drives were often used with the HP 3000 series family of minicomputers and later in early versions of the HP 9000 series computers. Drives were connected via the HP-IB interface to the host computer and multiple drives could be connected in a daisy-chain. The HP-IB address of the drive was selectable via DIP switches next to the interface.

The robustness of the drive hardware was tested by the 7.1 1989 Loma Prieta earthquake. The HP campus in Cupertino had 1,682 HP 7935 drives operating at the time of the quake and 97.25 percent were still operational afterwards. Within an hour, only 2 percent were non-operational and only 1.5 percent were non-operational several days later.

Later with development and production of smaller, rack mountable, high-density, sealed HP disc drive units using Winchester mechanism designs (like the HP 7963), the demand for HP793x drive line declined.

== See also ==
- History of hard disk drives
- HP 3000
- HP 9000
- HP Kittyhawk
