= Sti (disambiguation) =

An STI, or a sexually transmitted infection, is an infection transmitted through human sexual behavior.

STI, sti, or Sti may also refer to:

== Science and technology ==
=== Biology and psychology ===
- Signal transduction inhibitor, a class of pharmaceutical compounds
- Soft tissue injury, the damage of muscles, ligaments and tendons throughout the body
- Symptom targeted intervention, a treatment model for depression

=== Electronics and computing ===
- Shallow trench isolation, an integrated circuit
- STI (x86 instruction), a flag bit in the CPU relating to interrupts
- Still Image Architecture, an image scanner API

=== Other uses in science and technology ===
- Shimano Total Integration, a gearshift system for bicycles
- Speech transmission index, a measure of transmission quality
- Stationary target indication, a mode of radar operation
- Subaru Impreza WRX STI, a motor vehicle
- Verkehrsbetriebe STI, a bus operator in the Swiss canton of Bern

== Businesses and organizations ==
=== Educational organizations ===
- Sail Training International, an international maritime education charity
- STI College, a private college in the Philippines

=== In science and technology ===
- Semantic Technology Institute International, a research institute in Vienna, Austria
- Sega Technical Institute, a video game developer
- Subaru Tecnica International, the motorsports division of Subaru
- Sony, Toshiba, and IBM, co-developers of the Cell microprocessor

=== Other businesses and organizations ===
- Sangha Theravada Indonesia, one of various modern Buddhist organizations that still survive
- Scottish Trade International (1991-2001), later Scottish Development International
- Canadian airline Sontair, an ICAO code; see List of airline codes (S)

== Other uses ==
- Straits Times Index, a Singaporean stock market index
- Stirlingshire, a historic county in Scotland
- Cibao International Airport, an IATA code
- Shun Tin station, an MTR code
- Bulo Stieng language, an ISO 639-3 code

== See also ==
- ST1 (disambiguation)
