= ST1 =

ST1 may refer to:

- St1, a Finnish energy company
- Star Trek: The Motion Picture, a 1979 film, first in the original film series
- Star Trek (film), a 2009 film, first in the J.J.Abrams film series
- Starship Troopers (film), a 1997 film, first in the film series
- The Stoke-on-Trent area code, see ST postcode area
- Phillips ST1 Speedtwin, an acrobatic airplane, see Speedtwin E2E Comet 1
- Zenvo ST1, a supercar
- Seagate ST1, a hard disk drive
- ST-1, a communications satellite

== See also ==
- First Street (disambiguation) (1st Street)
- STI (disambiguation)
