= Seagate ST1 =

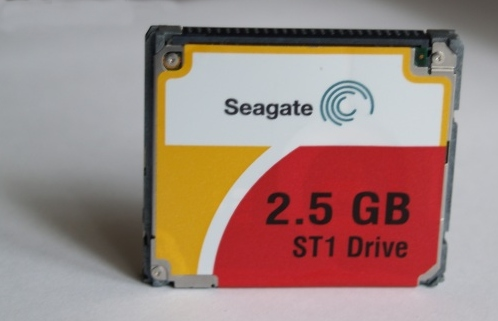
- 2.5 GB ST1 Drive
- Media type: Hard disk drive
- Encoding: RLL
- Capacity: 2.5 - 12 GB
- Developed by: Seagate Technology
- Manufactured by: Seagate Technology
- Dimensions: 42.0 mm × 36.0 mm × 5.0 mm
- Usage: Portable devices

The Seagate ST1 is a miniature 1-inch hard drive with the CompactFlash Type II form factor, much like IBM's Microdrive. Unlike Sony and Hitachi and allegedly GS Magicstor branded drives, Seagate developed their technology from scratch.

As of 2005 most 5 gigabyte MP3 players in production had ST1 drives embedded in them.

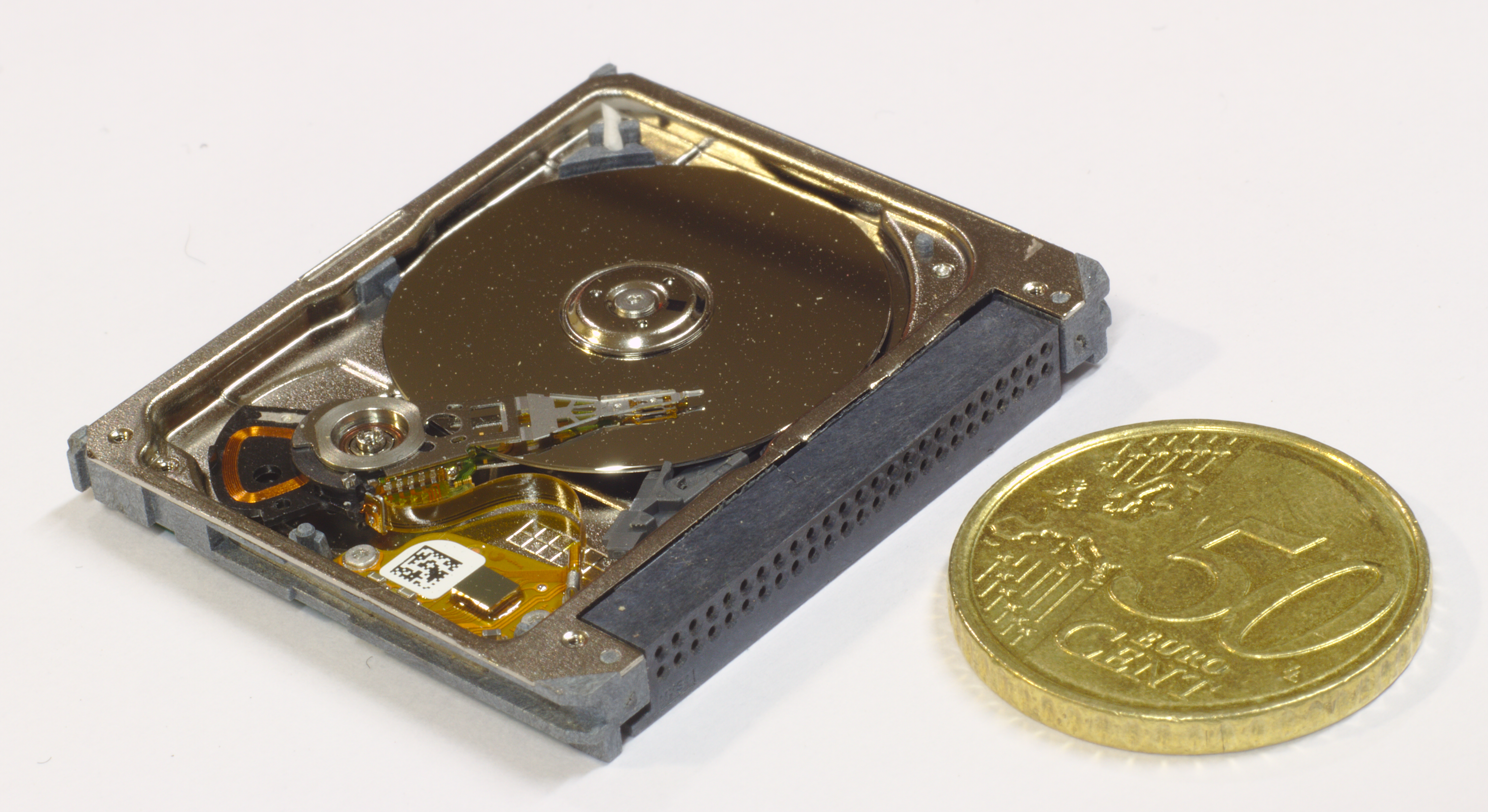
Inside of an 5 GB ST1 drive

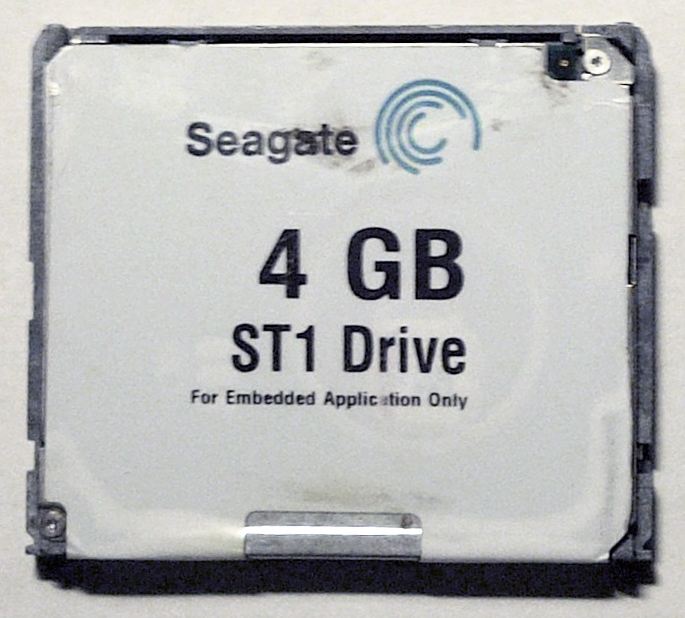
Seagate 4 GB ST1 Drive

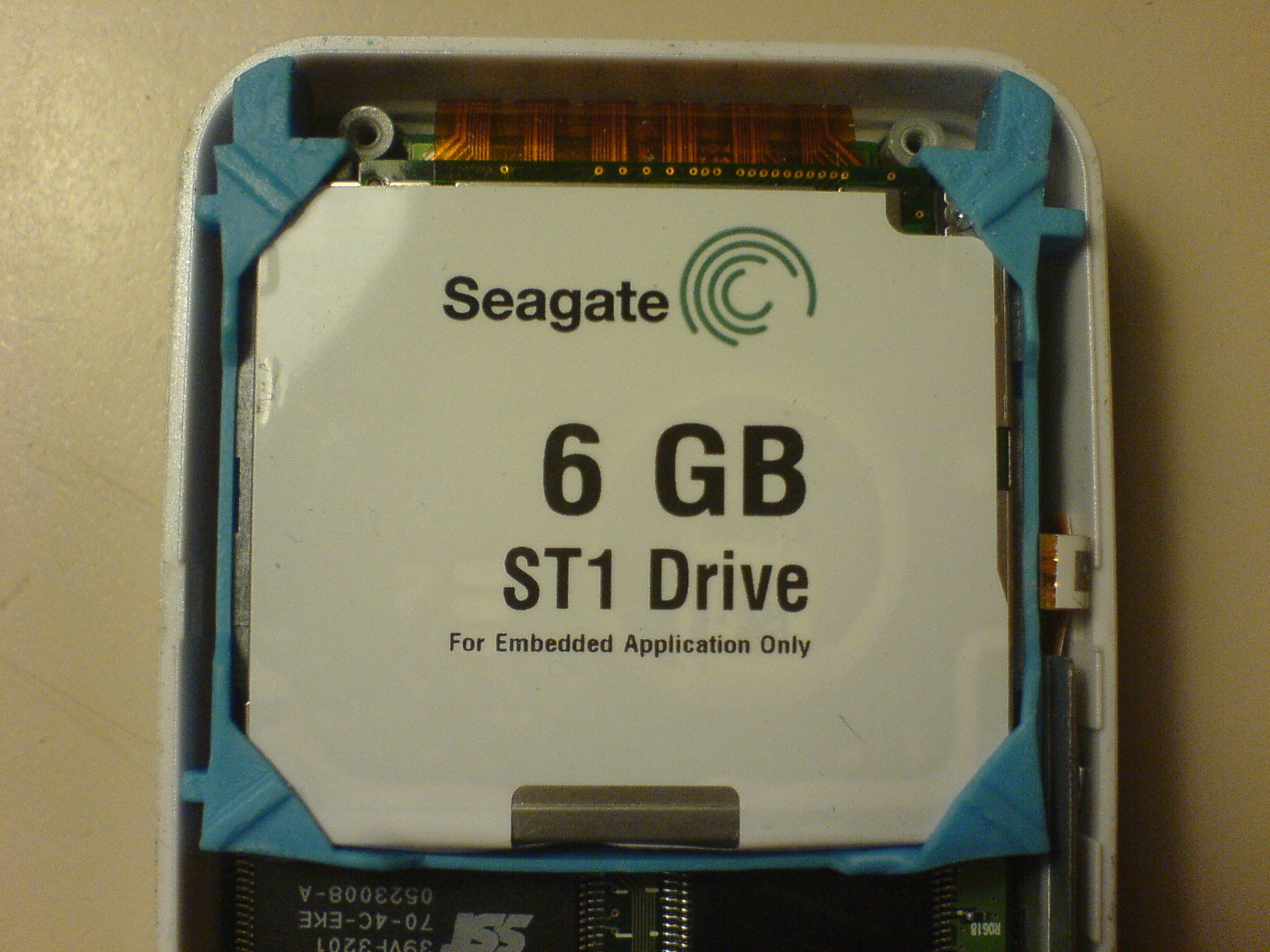
Seagate 6 GB ST1 Drive, from MP3 player Sanyo HDP-M3000

Notable improvements over IBM's design include:

- 2-megabyte data buffer
- A mechanism to hold the read-write head in place when the drive is not in use
- Some level of internal diagnostics

All ST1 drives have "For Embedded Application Only" printed on the back of them, which has led some people to think that the CF mode required for use in digital cameras is disabled. This is in fact not true and was most likely put there to remind the user that the drive was not designed for continuous use in a desktop computer.

== ST1 models ==
ST1 Series:

- ST625211CF/FX (2.5GB) (2004)
- ST650211CF/FX (5GB) (2004)

ST1.2 Series:

- ST64022CF/FX (4GB) (2005)
- ST66022CF/FX (6GB) (2005)
- ST68022CF/FX (8GB) (2005)

ST1.3 Series:

- ST660712DE/DEG (6GB) (2006)
- ST680712DE/DEG (8GB) (2006)
- ST610712DE/DEG (10GB) (2006)
- ST612712DE/DEG (12GB) (2006)

The CF, DE, DEG, FX suffixes are for CompactFlash+ Type II, ZIF, (zero insertion force) IDE interface, Flex (IDE interface) interfaces respectively. DEG models also include an additional free-fall sensor for robust drop performance.

Unlike most hard disk drives produced at that time, ST1.2 drives have physical sector size of 1024 bytes.
