= Symptom targeted intervention =

Symptom targeted intervention (STI) is a clinical program being used in medical settings to help patients who struggle with symptoms of depression or anxiety or adherence to treatment plans but who are not interested in receiving outpatient mental health treatment. STI is an individualized therapeutic model and clinical program that teaches patients brief, effective ways to cope with difficult thoughts, feelings, and behaviors using evidence-based interventions. Its individualized engagement process employs techniques from solution-focused therapy, using a Rogerian, patient-centered philosophy. This engagement process ensures that even challenging, at-risk, and non-adherent patients are able to participate.

Social workers and other mental health practitioners and medical professionals use STI to assist patients with a number of specific concerns, from sleep and stress to pain management, relationships and mood management. STI's coping tools are cognitive behavioral therapy and mindfulness interventions that have been condensed and modified to make them user friendly and effective in brief sessions. After meeting with the clinician, the patient takes charge, performing interventions at home through assignments that extend and reinforce learning.

Using STI, the clinician helps the patient identify the most problematic symptom of the depression (such as depressed mood, insomnia, anxiety, rumination, irritability, negative thinking, social isolation), then together the clinician and patient address that symptom using STI's evidence-based selection of brief cognitive, behavioral, and mindfulness techniques. The emphasis is on keeping interactions brief since mental health treatment in the primary care setting is typically time limited—although the Collaborative Care and Integrated Care models provides hope for improved and expanded mental health services in the primary care setting.

As patients learn better coping skills, they become more engaged with their treatment and more adherent to doctors’ recommendations.

STI also gives social workers ways to uncover their clinical strengths and tools to continue to work with resistant patients. With STI training, clinicians learn a nuanced approach to all patients, even those who resist help, since often those are the individuals who need help most. After learning STI, clinicians report that they are more likely to approach rather than avoid difficult patient situations.

== Origins ==
STI was created in 2009 by licensed clinical social worker (LCSW) Melissa McCool to give clinicians a toolkit for helping depressed patients who cannot or will not seek outpatient psychotherapy. McCool originally developed STI for patients with end-stage renal disease (ESRD). Patients with ESRD and other chronic diseases often suffer from depression and it often goes undiagnosed. Studies suggest that at least 25% of dialysis patients have clinical depression and at least 35% have symptoms that put them at risk for depression. Additionally, for a variety of reasons, patients who are suffering mentally and physically from depression often go untreated. Social workers using STI with ESRD patients have reported promising outcomes.

The intellectual premise for STI is based on systems theory, which considers a system as a set of interacting and independent parts. If depression is a system consisting of various symptoms, when one of the symptoms improves, the entire trajectory of the depressive episode is transformed. In this sense, STI is related to Bowen's systemic theory and its interactional dynamics. Using STI, the patient and clinician focus on one element, or symptom, helping the patient avoid feeling overwhelmed by multiple problems. The parallel process is also in effect: Clinicians may be similarly overwhelmed by attempting to tackle multiple symptoms in their depressed patients.

Also central to STI is the cognitive triangle, which illustrates how one's thoughts, feelings, and behaviors are all interconnected and dependent upon one another. If a behavior changes, thoughts and feelings change; if a thought changes, behaviors and feelings change.

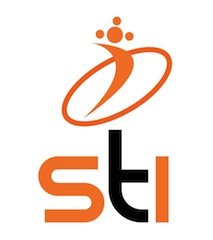
STI Innovations logo

STI has been expanded beyond ESRD to support the many patients who are suffering from depression who receive treatment for chronic disease in outpatient clinics, hospitals, nursing homes or rehabilitation centers. Kaiser Permanente is now using STI as the main treatment modality in its Collaborative Care study.

== Impact ==
A review of treatments for anxiety and depression in dialysis patients cited STI as an economical way to alleviate depression using brief, in-clinic sessions. A review that considered measures of quality of life in patients with ESRD noted that STI's techniques are promising and productive. STI was included in a 2013 review of best practices for effective screening and managing depression in dialysis patients.

In a 2014 article about ways that social workers can ease chronically ill patients’ burdens and effectively address their emotional challenges, Joseph R. Merighi, PhD, MSW, an associate professor at the University of Minnesota School of Social Work, describes STI as “an innovative, brief, and patient-centered approach that modifies cognitive, behavioral, and mindfulness techniques to make them user-friendly for patients and brief in their delivery.” The article's author adds that STI is “used by the leading dialysis providers and has become the standard of care.”

STI is now being used by medical social workers in a range of settings across the United States, who have reported positive results. To teach social workers STI's techniques, trainings are held across the country, led by Ms. McCool and her colleagues, in person as well as through online webinars. Nephrology social workers who participated in a 2014 study of the effectiveness of STI webinar trainings found the trainings to be very useful and wanted them to continue.

STI is used by medical practices and Accountable Care Organizations (ACOs) for population health management and in integrated care and chronic care. STI provides curriculum, training, clinical assessment tools, and treatment plans for these organizations through 20 min win, a system that allows patient issues, identified in required biopsychosocial care plans, to be addressed in 20-minute sessions.

== Research ==
In 2011, STI was assessed by nephrology social workers in 17 states. Results suggested that STI further enhances existing social work skills in identifying, treating, and tracking outcomes of patient issues requiring clinical intervention. Most of the social workers spent 1.5 hours over a six-week period using STI to address symptoms of depression with a patient. This short period of intervention led to a reported improvement in physical component summary and mental component summary scores (part of the Short Form Health Survey (SF-36) patient evaluation) in 51% and 64% of patients, respectively, and improvement in CES-D scores in 72.1% of patients. In 2013, a pilot program showed that using STI's techniques helped increase patients' adherence to treatment recommendations.

A 2013 study by DaVita Inc., published at the National Kidney Foundation meeting in April 2014, showed statistically significant improvements in quality of life and depression scores for patients receiving STI. There were 91 participants in the study. Statistically significant improvement occurred in KDQOL-36 mental component scores (p < 0.001), physical component scores (p = 0.042), as well as burden (p < 0.001) and effects (p = 0.001) domain scores. Statistically significant improvement also occurred in patients' CES-D 10 scores (p < 0.001).

In an ongoing study conducted by Fresenius Medical Care, the use of STI, along with other clinical interventions, was shown to decrease missed treatments, decrease hospitalizations and improve quality of life indicators and depression scores. The baseline number of missed treatment rate (per month) was 1.7 (±1.3) vs. 0.9 (±1.0) post-intervention (p < 0.0001). The number of hospitalization was 0.4 (±0.8) vs. 0.2 (±0.8) per month for pre- and post-intervention, respectively, (p = 0.07). Significant improvement was found in CES-D 10 and KDQOL-36 domain scores except for physical component scores. Sleep-quality barriers and stressors also indicated significant improvement (except for restless legs and stressors related to health symptoms or loss/grief). Preliminary results indicated that an intensive social worker-initiated intervention program was able to reduce unexcused missed treatments in the short term (three months). Indicators of quality of life and well-being that potentially contributed to the non-adherent behavior also improved, which may help sustain the favorable results over the long term.

Results of a 2015 study by Melissa McCool and colleagues at DaVita Inc. suggested that implementation of a social worker-based STI clinical program targeting improved quality of life for in-center hemodialysis patients led to health improvements due to increased adherence to the prescribed dialysis treatment regimen in the least-compliant patients. A poster presenting the results received best poster award at the National Kidney Foundation spring 2015 meeting. A pilot study using STI with transplant patients at the Royal Infirmary of Edinburgh was completed in 2014, and a poster presenting the results was included in the British Renal Society's annual meeting in July 2015.

Further studies are under way on the effectiveness of STI in patients with a variety of chronic diseases, including an ongoing multi-center IRB-approved research study involving the University of Maryland, University of Utah, and University of Minnesota, on the use of STI with solid organ transplant recipients.
