= Microdrive =

One-inch hard disk format by IBM and Hitachi

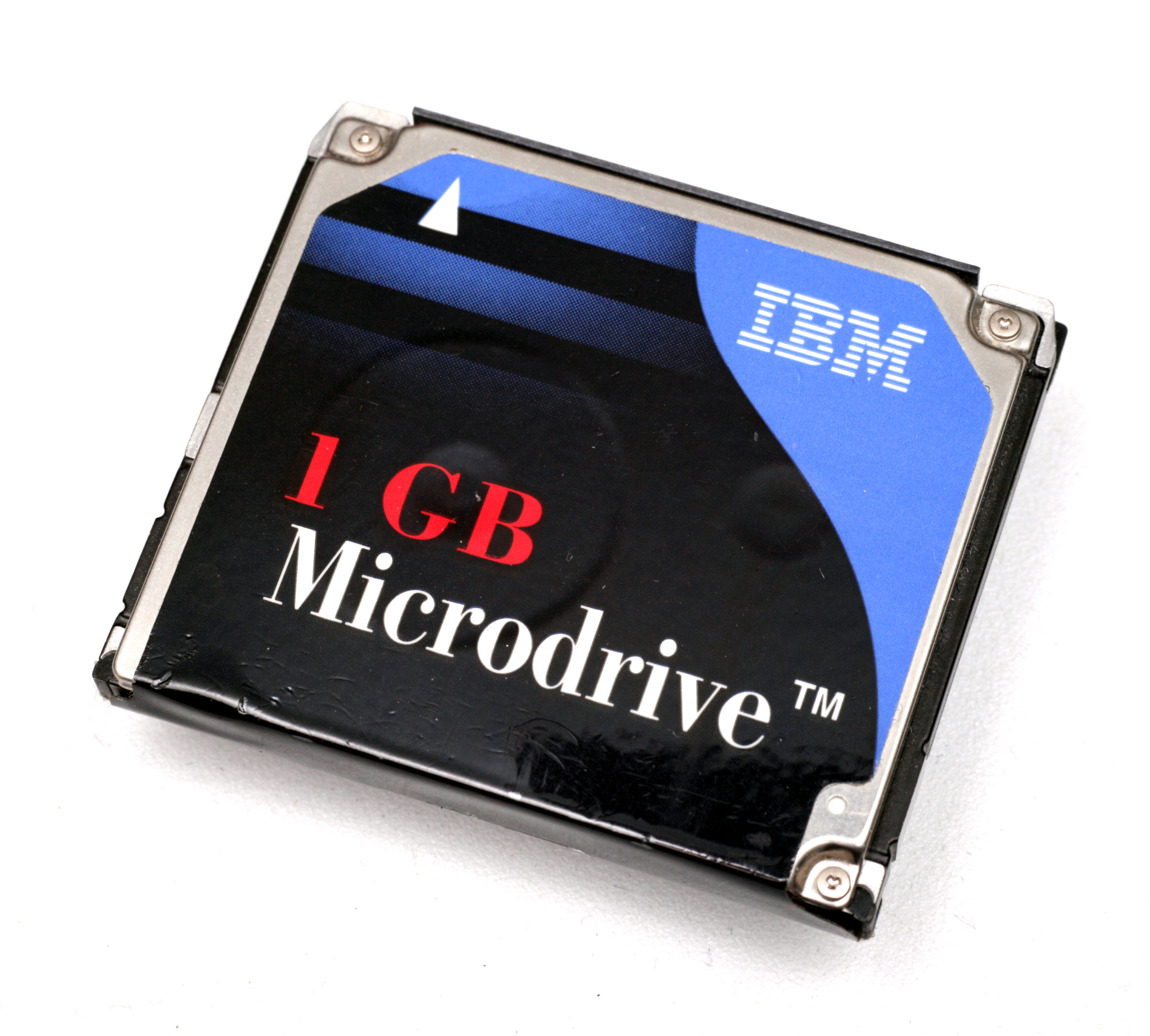
- 1 GB IBM Microdrive
- Media type: Hard disk drive
- Encoding: RLL
- Capacity: 170 MB - 8 GB
- Developed by: Timothy J. Riley, Thomas R. Albrecht, IBM Fujisawa
- Manufactured by: IBM, Hitachi
- Dimensions: 42.0 mm × 36.0 mm × 5.0 mm
- Usage: Portable audio players, Notebook computers, PDAs, Digital cameras
- Released: September 9, 1998
- Discontinued: 2012

The Microdrive was a miniature, one-inch hard disk drive released in 1998 by IBM. The idea was originally created in 1992 by Timothy J. Riley and Thomas R. Albrecht at the Almaden Research Center in San Jose. A team of engineers and designers at IBM's Fujisawa, Japan facility helped make the creation of the drive possible.

Due to the failure of the Kittyhawk, a 1.3-inch hard disk drive also created in 1992 by Hewlett Packard, initial support for it was reluctant. Despite that, development persisted. The Microdrive caused the creation of and used the CompactFlash Type II format which became the de facto standard for devices utilizing the technology at the time. Because of this, and its advantages over flash technology, the Microdrive ended up being a success.

Although a niche for a short time, the Microdrive market later became very competitive. Many companies began producing miniature hard disk drives also referred to as Microdrives. Some offered more storage capacity or were even smaller in physical size to the original Microdrive. This did not last long however. By the mid to late 2000s, miniature hard disk drives were being viewed as obsolete with flash media such as CompactFlash, SD, and USB flash surpassing them in speed, capacity, durability, and pricing.

== History ==
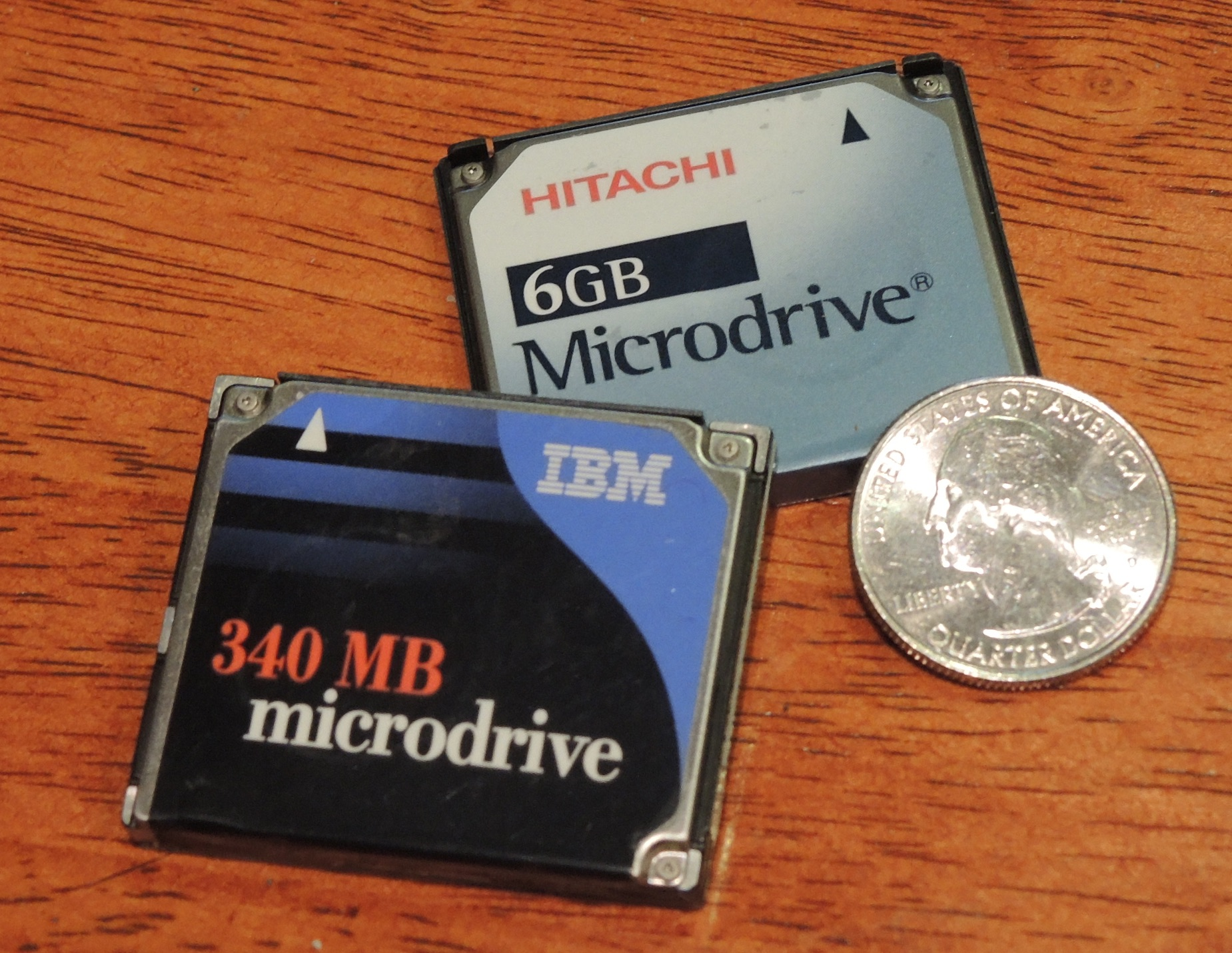
IBM and Hitachi Microdrive harddisk drives, with an American quarter for size comparison

=== Precursor ===
Main Article: HP Kittyhawk

In June of 1992, prior to the Microdrive, a 1.3-inch hard disk drive nicknamed the "Kittyhawk" was launched. It was a collaboration creation by Hewlett Packard, AT&T and Citizen Watch. It was the smallest hard drive in the world at the time, being 2.0" × 1.44" × 0.414" (50.8mm × 36.5mm × 10.5mm) in size while offering 20, then later 40 MB of storage capacity. The Kittyhawk was a colossal failure, and was withdrawn 2 years later in 1994. In 1996, HP shut down its Disk Memory Division and exited the market.

=== Development ===
Thomas Albrecht (left) and Timothy Reiley showing the Microdrive (right) next to a CompactFlash card

The idea of the Microdrive was created by IBM researcher Timothy J. Reiley who was working at the Almaden Research Center in San Jose. He wanted to create a small form factor hard disk drive with high capacity storage that would be used for mobile devices, after working on a project to look at Micromechanics. Originally Reiley planned for the drive to use Microelectromechanical systems for parts of the drive such as the spindle motor and head actuator. Thomas R. Albrecht, another researcher, collaborated with Reiley to design and create the drive. Thomas changed the drive technology to miniaturized conventional technologies instead due to the increased technical risk and costs of using microelectromechanical systems.

The leader of mobile drive development at the IBM Fujisawa facility at the time, Hideya Ino, highly sought the potential of a 1-inch disk drive. He had a team collaborate with the IBM researchers to create working prototypes. Those prototypes were then used to persuade product planning and marketing teams to support the project. Two notable people from the Japan development team were Mitsuhiko Aoyagi and Kenji Kuroki, who contributed to launching the product line. Bill Healey and John Osterhout worked at the storage technology division in San Jose and were responsible for the business development and marketing of the Microdrive.

=== Announcement/Launch ===
In September 1998, IBM announced the Microdrive, a year before the expected launch.

“For IBM Disk Drives, this was an uncharacteristically early announcement. We normally would never announce a product a year in advance of shipments,” Albrecht said. “Everyone agreed that it was necessary. People needed to design Type II slots, and there were also questions whether we were serious about this.”

It was advertised by marketers in varying ways. One source claimed it was about the size of a large coin, weighing less than an AA battery, and had the capacity of over 200 floppy disks. Another said it weighed half as much as a golf ball, and had a capacity of 300 novels. A manager at Sanyo said it could store 1,500 1.5 mega-pixel images or 10 minutes of VGA-quality video. The Microdrive was expected to be launched by mid-1999, and would be a competitor to CompactFlash, which was originally released in 1994.

On June 24, 1999, IBM Japan announced the IBM Microdrive 340 MB for ¥58,000 or $475 USD.

On August 24, 1999, Microtech International announced they would be the first North American distributor of the 340 MB Microdrive.

In June 1999, IBM officially launched the first generation 1-inch Microdrive. The drive was initially ordered by several companies such as Compaq, Casio, Minolta, Nikon, and more.

The first generation of the Microdrive was a partial success, having a few products released using the drive such as the Sanyo VPC-SX500, and Casio QV2000UX.

=== Second Generation ===
A second generation of Microdrive was announced by IBM the following year in June 2000. These models would draw less power with a spindle speed reduction to 3600 RPM and have a higher bit density of 15.2 gigabit-per-square-inch. They would have increased capacities at 512 MB and 1 GB with the 512 MB model costing $399 and the 1 GB model $499 upon release. The original 340 MB Microdrive would be decreasing to $299. The initial Microdrive models had limited-success due to their price tag. It was hoped with the improved models use could be expanded to other products such as audio players and handheld computers.

The Microdrive was more expensive than conventional hard drives at the time, but less expensive than CompactFlash. The Microdrive cost $0.50 per MB while CompactFlash was $2 per MB.

==== Microdrive in Space ====
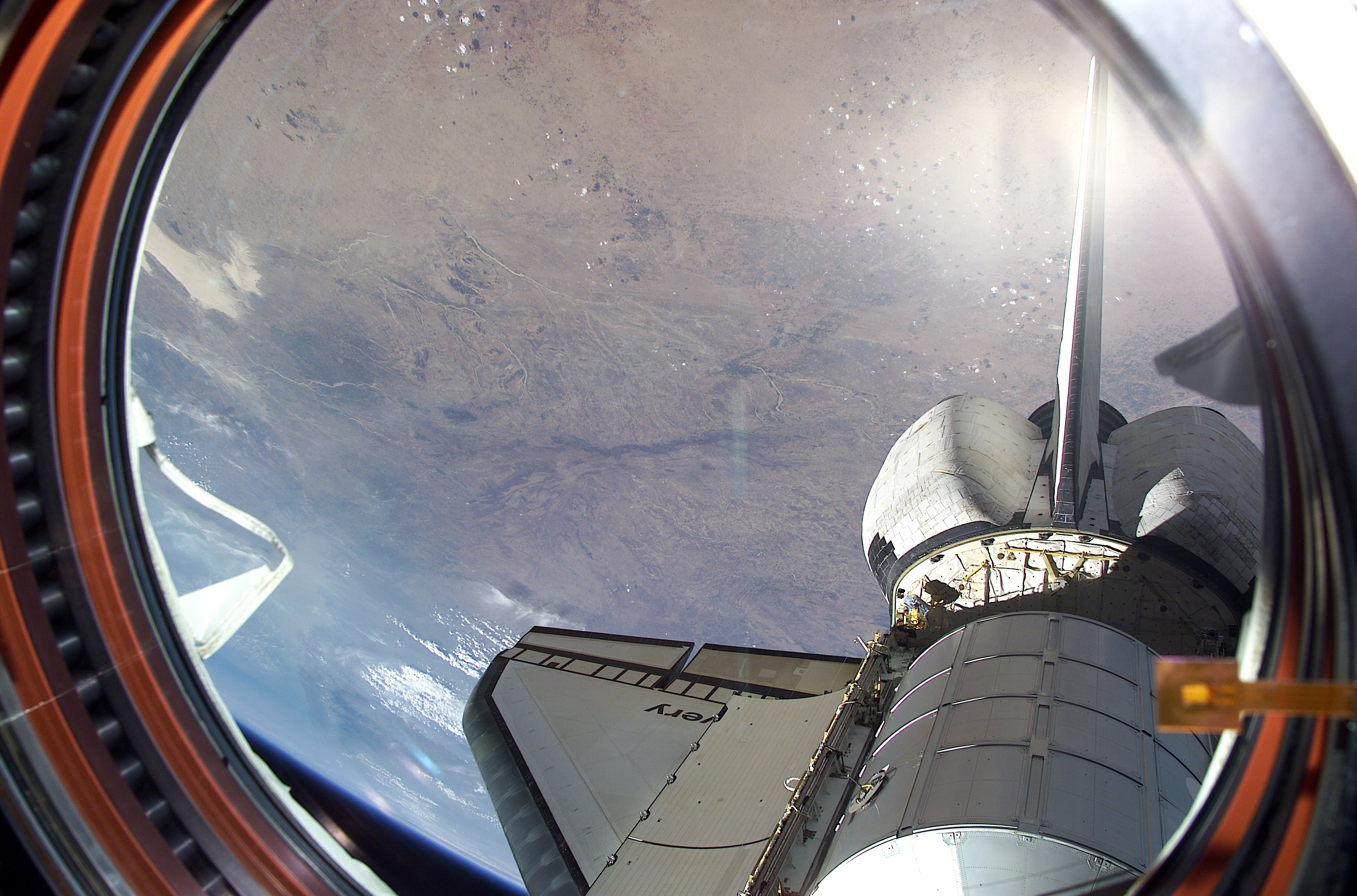
One of the images stored by the Microdrive, taken on the STS-102 mission showing Discovery's payload bay

The 1GB Microdrive was successfully used to store and bring back digital images from NASA's STS98 and STS102 shuttle missions in 2001. The Microdrive was first tested with high doses of radiation and durability in a weightless environment before being used on the missions. It was put in a Kodak DCS 660 camera and was used to take hundreds of photographs on the missions.

=== Hitachi Merge ===
Following the merger of IBM and Hitachi HDD business units, Hitachi Global Storage Technologies continued the development and marketing of the Microdrive. In 2003, 2 GB and 4 GB models were announced by Hitachi. The 4 GB model was first available on February 20, 2004 for a price of $499. This was followed by a 6 GB capacity model in February 2005 for a price of $299, with the 4 GB model dropping to $199. Hitachi additionally planned an even smaller 1-inch hard drive with a capacity of 8-10 GB under the code-name "Mikey" for late 2005 with a weight of 14 grams and a size of 40 mm × 30 mm × 5 mm.

=== Discontinuation ===
By 2006, flash-based CompactFlash cards surpassed Microdrives in maximum size and over time became less expensive as well, which rendered the technology obsolete. As of July 2012, there are no known manufacturers of 1-inch form-factor hard disk drives. Hitachi had also stopped production of its trademarked Microdrive product.

By 2007, sales and profit of the Microdrive were dwindling so Hitachi discontinued production of 1 inch hard disk drives. Sales of 1-inch drives were only about 3,000 in a three-month period in 2007, while 560,000 units of 1-1.8-inch drives were sold throughout July to September 2007. Hitachi wanted to shift over to bigger 2.5 and 3.5-inch hard disk drives, rather than retain focus on the small hard disk drive business.

== Features ==
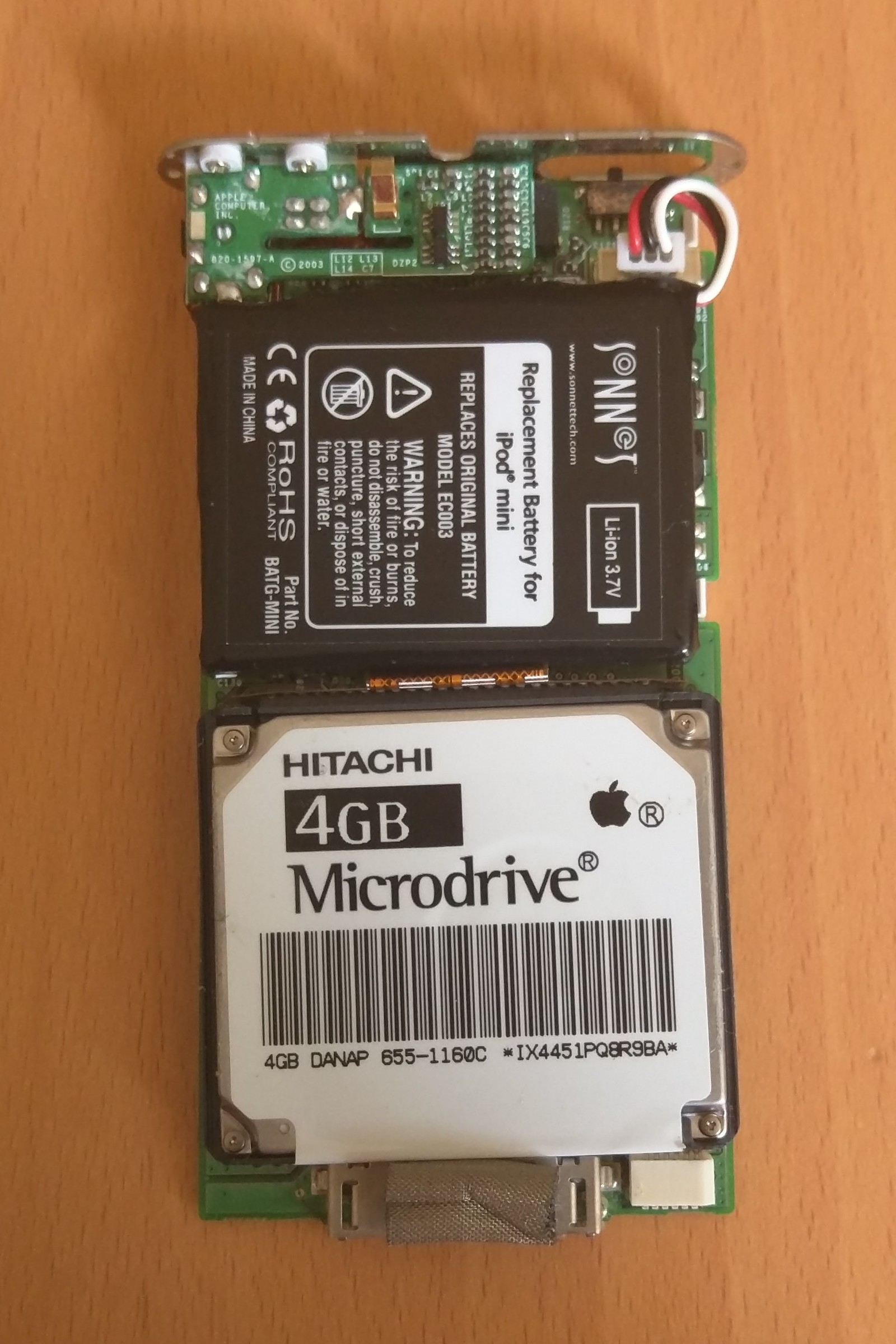
A disassembled 1st-generation iPod Mini, which uses a Microdrive to store data

Microdrives weigh less than a roll of 35mm film.

Until 2006, Microdrives had higher capacity than CompactFlash cards. As of 2006, Microdrive's capacity advantages were exceeded by CompactFlash cards (which are the same size and are often compatible with each other), and USB flash drives.

Microdrives allow more write cycles than flash storage, making them suitable for use as swap space in embedded applications. Flash storage always needs to move some old data around while writing, to ensure the flash's finite write life is consumed equally. Microdrives are better at handling power loss in the middle of writing: a bug in the wear levelling algorithm can cause data loss in flash storage were a card unplugged at the exact wrong time. Data on rotational disks is modified in place, and hard drive algorithms at the time were much more advanced than those of flash storage. Being mechanical devices however, they are more sensitive to physical shock and temperature changes than flash memory. For example, a microdrive will generally not survive a 4-foot (1.2-meter) drop onto a hard surface whereas CF cards can survive much higher falls. They are not designed to operate at high altitudes (over 10,000 feet or 3,000 meters) but can be safely used on most commercial aircraft as cabins are generally pressurized.

Microdrives are not as fast as the high-end CompactFlash cards; they generally operate at around 4–6 megabytes per second while high-end CF cards can operate at 45 megabytes per second.

Unlike flash storage, Microdrives require power even when no data is being transferred to or read from them, just to keep the disk spinning in order to maintain quick access. As a result, many devices such as the iPod mini leave the drive switched off for most of the time while periodically starting it up to fetch data from it to fill the device's buffer. Microdrives will switch off after idling for more than a few seconds to counter this problem; however, this means that it needs to spin up for the next access, which takes about 1 second. This effect would be particularly problematic if an operating system is being run from the drive, as seen in the case of the Palm LifeDrive.

Since they are thicker than flash-based CF cards, Microdrives require a Type II slot. Many newer compact cameras only have a Type I slot due to the increasing popularity of flash-based cards, so Microdrives have limited popularity outside of the professional photography market.

Certain bus-powered CF card readers lack the power needed to run a Microdrive although they do take CF II cards. When using such a device, it will usually be detected by the host, but errors will occur once the user attempts to access the drive.

Some "OEM Only" drives use the CompactFlash form factor but only provide a 5V IDE/ATA interface. These will not work in readers or devices which expect a 3.3V interface and full CompactFlash functionality.

== Model Table & Timeline ==
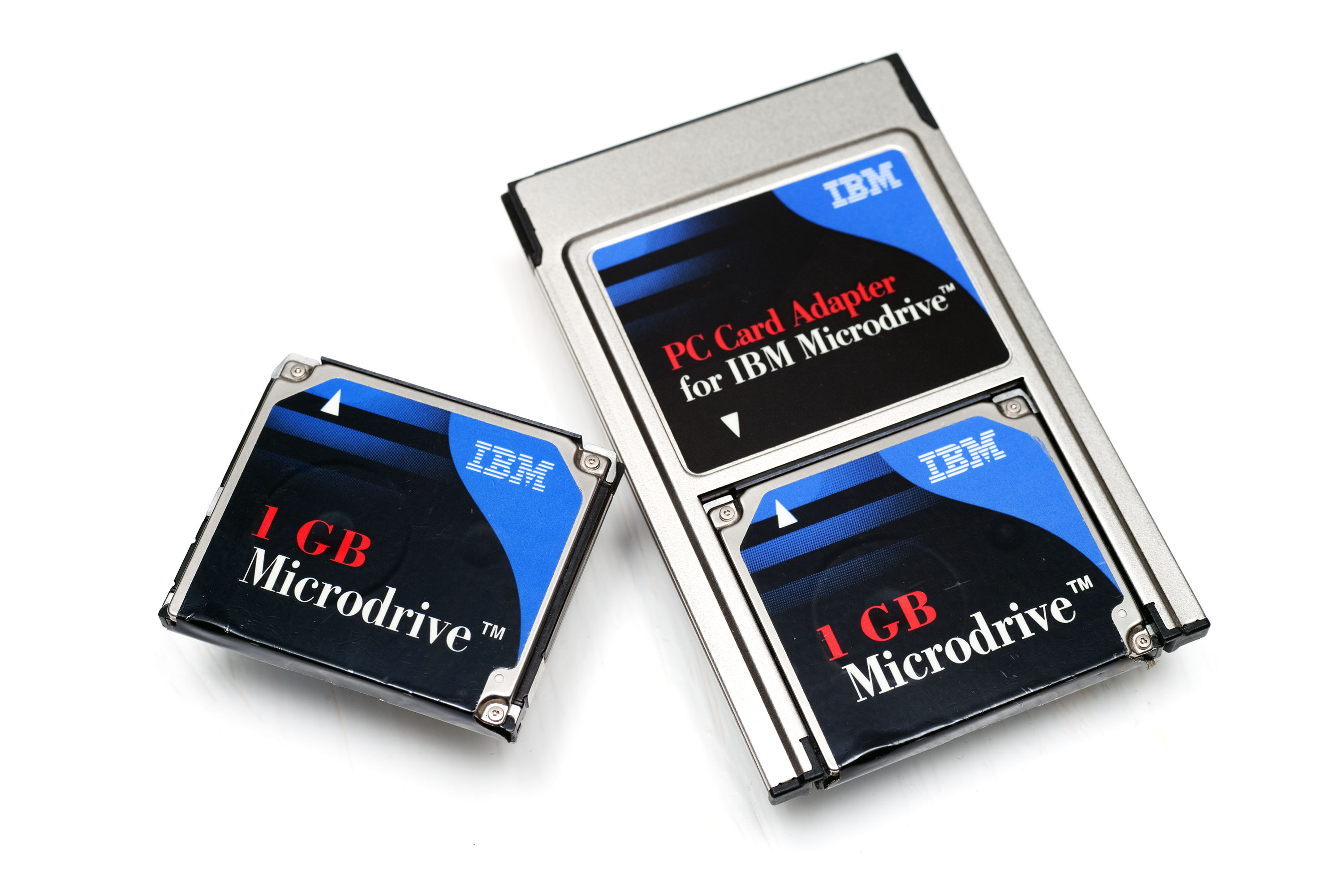
A pair of 1gb IBM Microdrives, with a PCMCIA/Cardbus adapter

Model	Capacity	Released	Discontinued
DMDM-10170	170 MB	June 1999	June 2000
DMDM-10340	340 MB	June 1999	June 2000
DSCM-10340	340 MB	June 2000	December 2002
DSCM-10512	512 MB	June 2000	December 2002
DSCM-11000	1 GB	June 2000	December 2002
IBM/Hitachi Merge
	340 MB		
	512 MB	Jan 2003	
	1 GB	Jan 2003	
3K4-2	2 GB	August 23 2003	
3K4-4	4 GB	August 23 2003	
3K6-3	3 GB		
3K6-4	4 GB		
3K6-6	6 GB	Feb 23 2005	January 2008
3K8-8	8 GB		January 2008
Unreleased
3K8-10	10 GB	N/A	

== Other Manufacturers & Sizes ==
=== Halo Data Devices ===
Founded in April 1998, Halo Data Devices was a direct competitor to IBM's Microdrive. They designed a 1-inch hard disk drive that was slightly thinner than the IBM drive, and was compatible with CompactFlash Type I devices.

=== Seagate ===
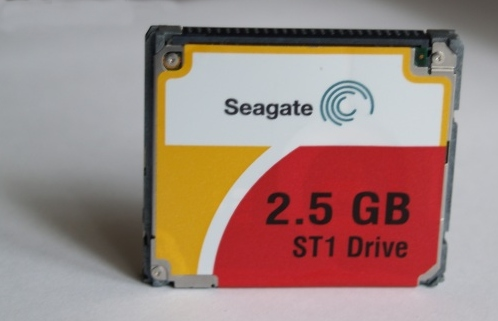
Seagate 2.5 GB Microdrive

Main Article: Seagate ST1

In 2004, Seagate launched 2.5 and 5 GB hard disk drives in the same small physical form-factor as IBM Microdrive and referred to them as either 1-inch hard drives or CompactFlash hard drives due to the trademark issue. These drives were also commonly known as the Seagate ST1. In 2005, Seagate launched an 8 GB model. Seagate also sold a standalone consumer product based on these drives with a product known as the Pocket Hard Drive. These devices came in the shape of a hockey puck with an integrated USB 2.0 cable.

Seagate launched their 6 GB mini drive on the same day as Hitachi, in February 2005.

=== Western Digital ===
In early 2005, Western Digital announced they would be joining the mini hard drive market with their own drives. These would be available by the second half of 2005 and reach capacities up to 6 GB.

Western Digital launched a 6 GB external USB 2.0 microdrive as a part of the Passport Pocket brand in March 2006. This was made as a competitor to the Seagate Pocket Hard Drive. The unit had 2 MB of cache, 11 ms seek, spun at 3,600 RPM, and was 60 × 45 × 9 mm. The price for the unit was $130 upon release.

=== GS Magicstor ===
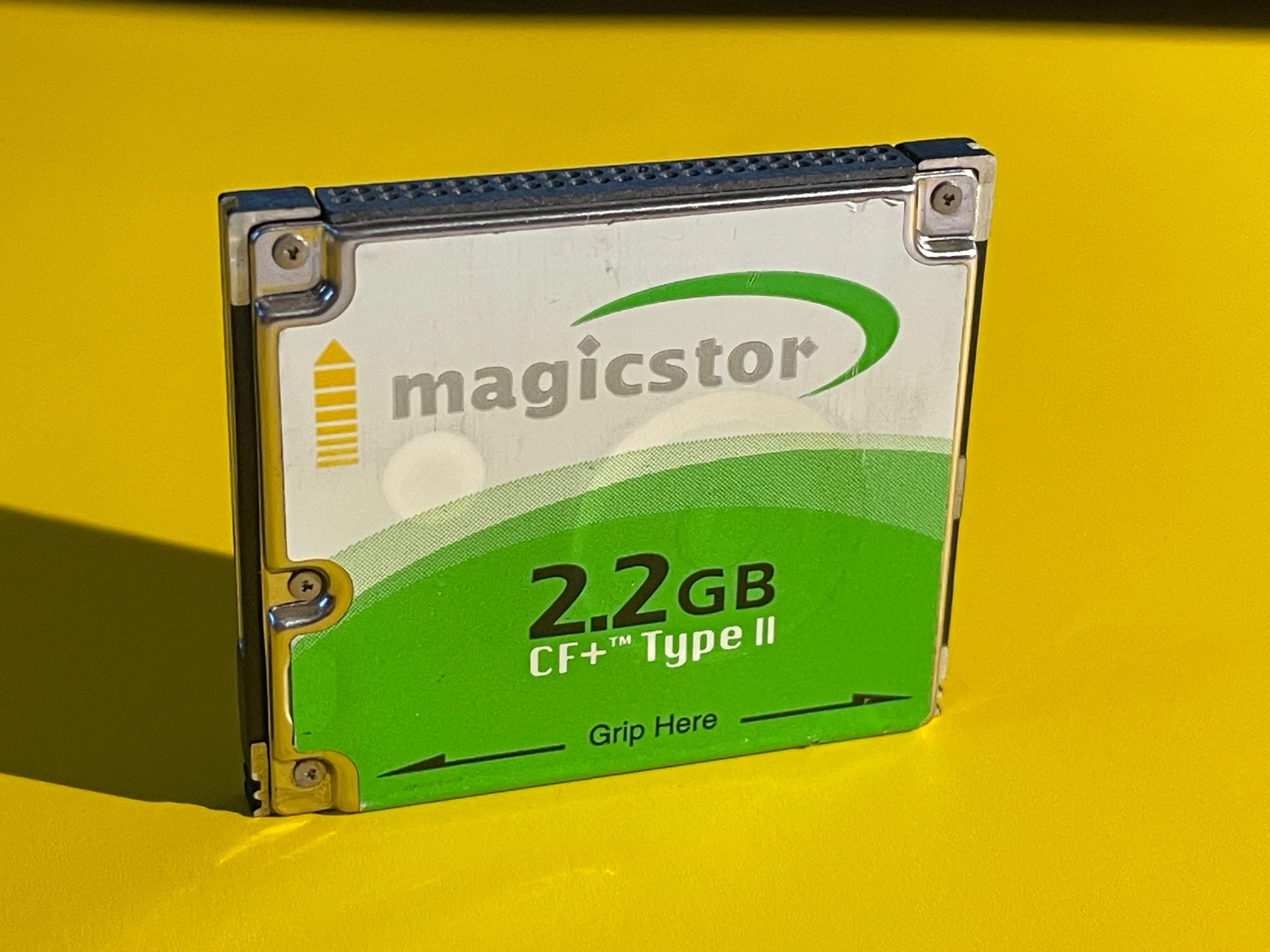
Magicstor 2.2 GB Microdrive

On July 16, 2003, a Chinese manufacturer called GS Magicstor, Inc. (subsidiary of GS Magic, Inc.) announced it had produced 1-inch hard disk drive with capacity of 2.4 GB at the beginning of the year 2003, originally marketed as an alternative to Microdrive by Hitachi Global Storage Technologies. It was to be followed by 2.2 and 4.8 GB 1-inch HDD that was unveiled in 2004 International CES, with 0.8-inch HDD. On December 28, 2004, Hitachi Global Storage Technologies announced it had filed lawsuit against GS Magicstor, Inc., GS Magic, Inc., and Riospring, Inc. for infringement of multiple Hitachi GST's patents relating to hard disk drives, after GS Magic Inc. had started promoting mini-HDD (small form factor hard disk drive).

=== Cornice ===
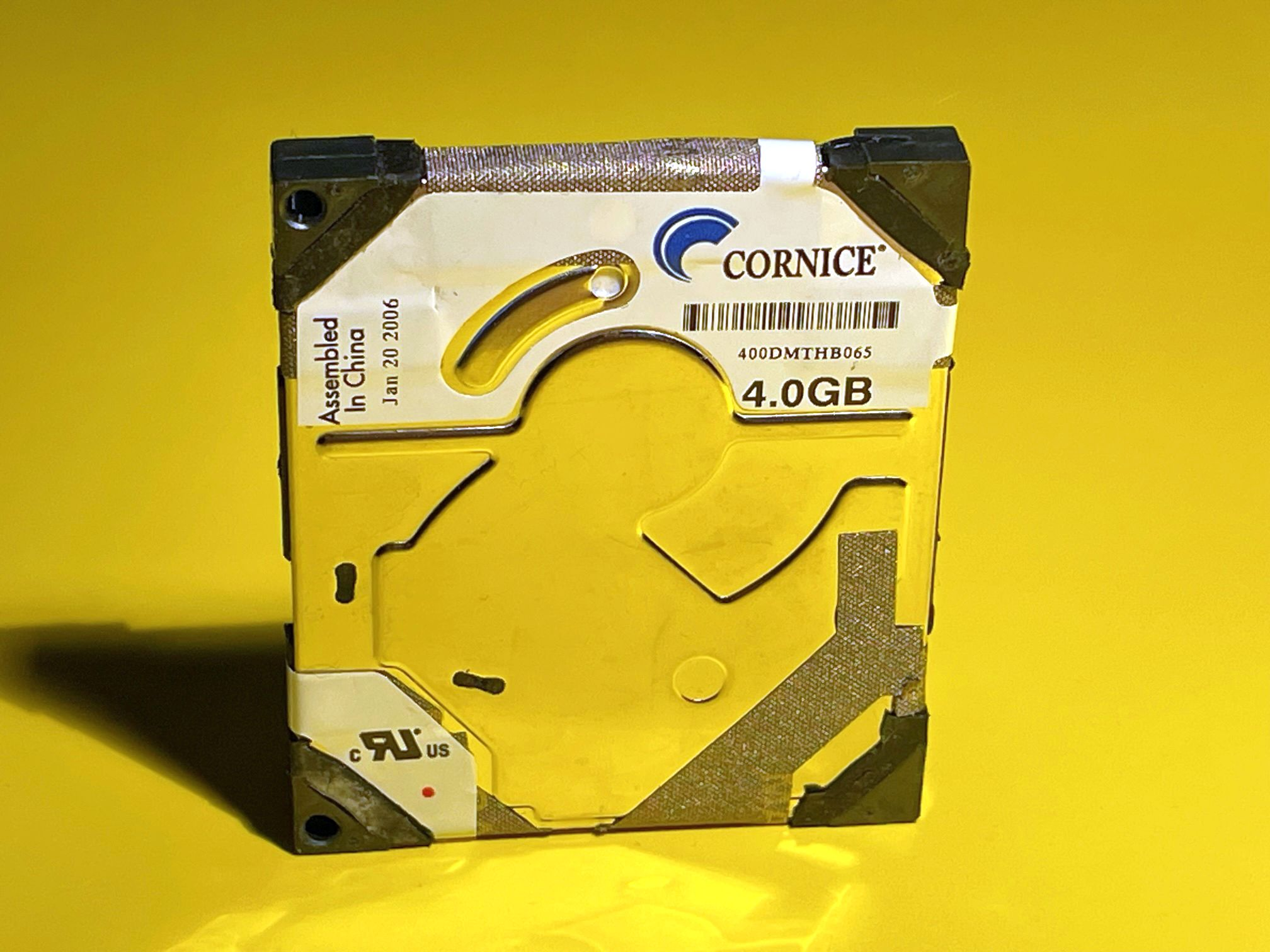
Cornice 4 GB Microdrive

Cornice was founded in 2000. Based in Longmont (Colorado), it quickly came out with 4GB and 8GB microdrive models, destined to the MP3 player and mobile phone markets. Hit with patent infringement lawsuits by Seagate and other disk drive companies, and faced with stiff competition and lagging sales, the company eventually folded in 2007.

=== Toshiba ===
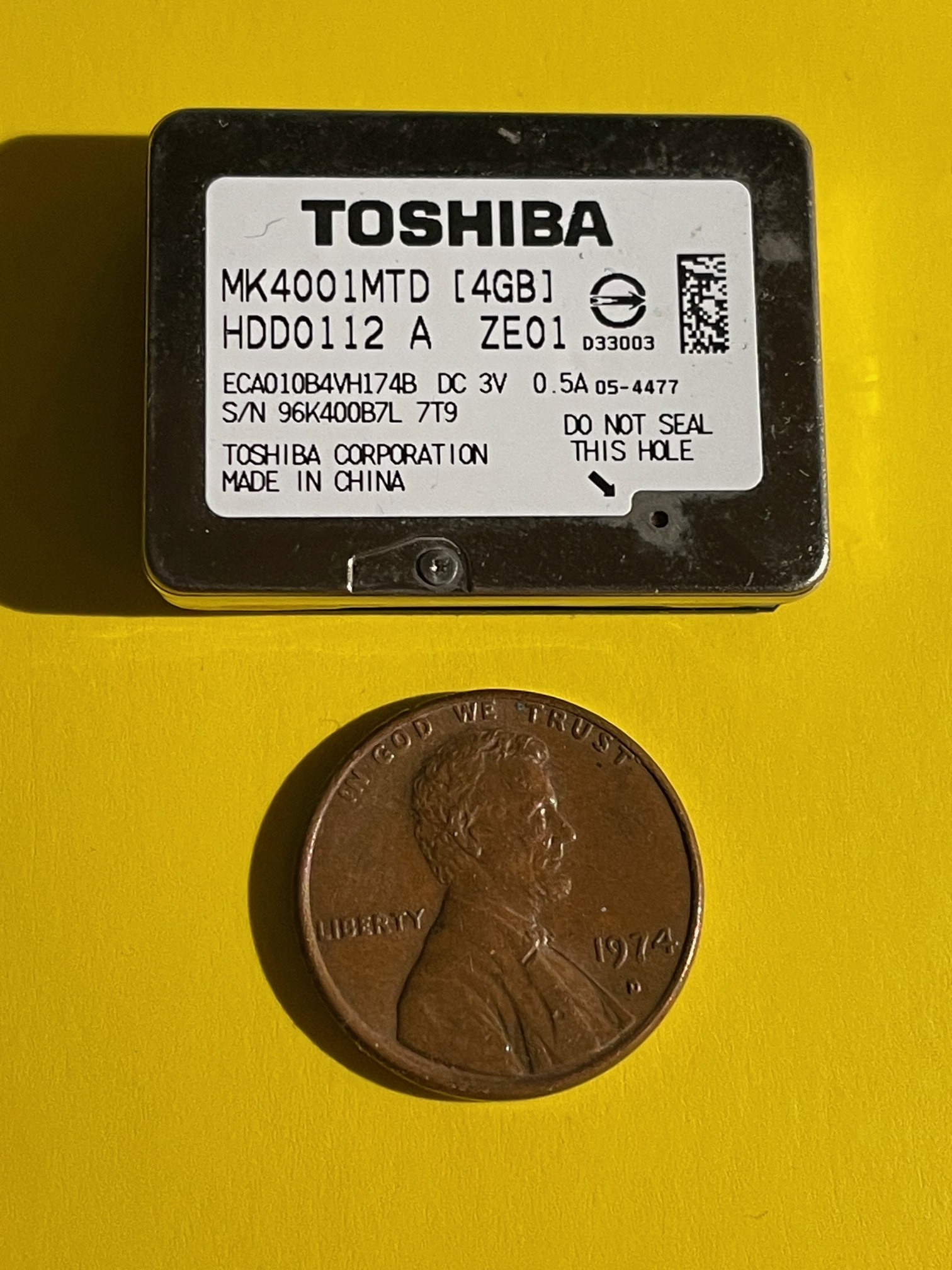
Toshiba 4 GB 0.85" drive

Toshiba decided to skip the 1" form factor, and in March 2004 announced a 0.85" drive that shipped in September of the same year. This form factor remains the smallest one ever shipped. Capacities of 2 and 4 GB were offered, destined primarily to the cellular phone market.

=== Samsung ===
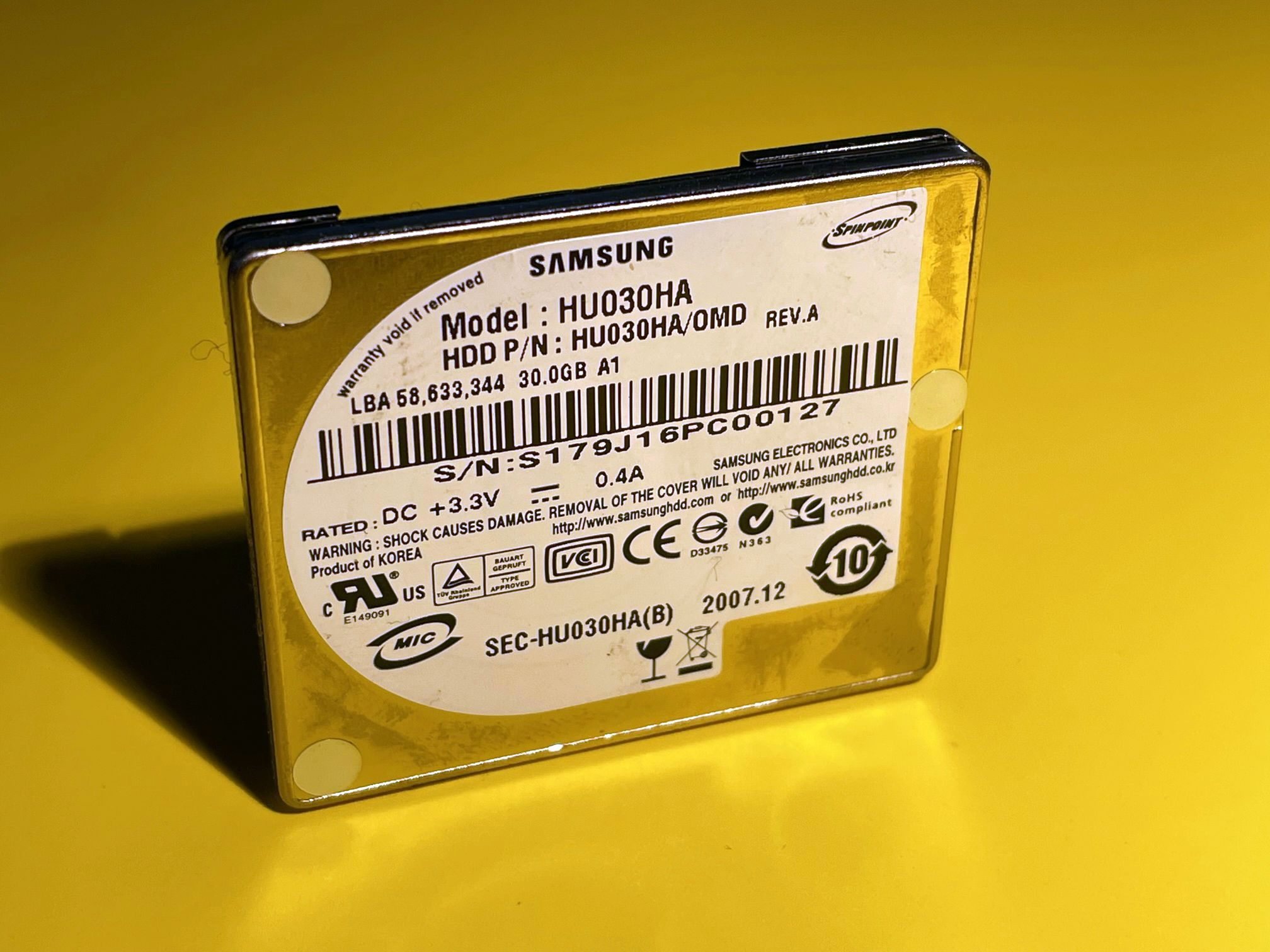
Samsung 30 GB microdrive

Samsung entered the microdrive market at a very late stage in 2008 with announced capacities of 20, 30 and 40 GB. Doing away with the bulky compact flash II connector, Samsung Spinpoint A1 microdrives were able to use a 1.3" diameter disk, while keeping the same outer microdrive dimensions (42.8mmx32.4mmx5mm). They also used perpendicular recording technology which had just been introduced in the hard disk industry. At the time when flash memory was becoming the medium of choice for all portable application, Samsung's entry was very short lived, with only one product carrying the 30 GB model known to ship: JVC's Everio GZ-MG73, an ultra-slim camcorder.

== See also ==
- HP Kittyhawk
- CompactFlash
- Seagate ST1
- Digital camera
