= HP Kittyhawk =

Hard disk drive introduced by Hewlett-Packard on June 9th, 1992

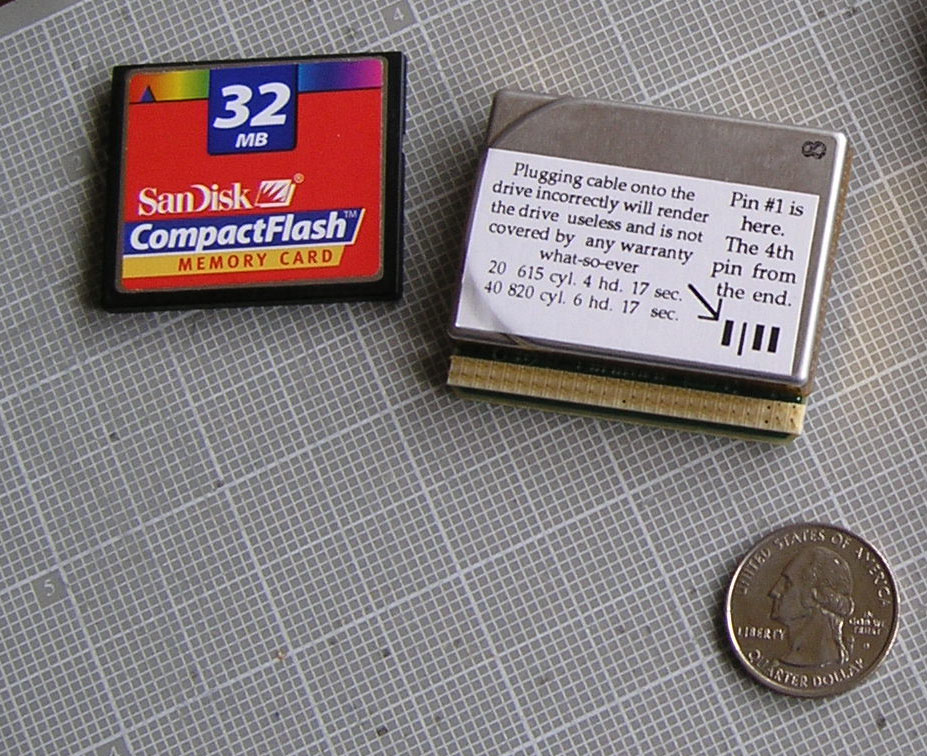
- 32 MB CompactFlash card (left) and quarter (bottom right) comparison in size to a Kittyhawk drive (center)
- Media type: Hard disk drive
- Encoding: MFM, RLL
- Capacity: Up to 40 MB
- Developed by: Hewlett-Packard, AT&T
- Manufactured by: Citizen Watch
- Dimensions: 2.0 × 1.44 × 0.414 in (50.8 × 36.6 × 10.5 mm)
- Weight: 1 oz (28 g)
- Usage: Portable devices, notebooks
- Released: June 1992

The Hewlett-Packard HP3013/3014, nicknamed Kittyhawk, was a hard disk drive introduced by Hewlett-Packard on June 9, 1992. Developed with assistance from AT&T and manufactured by Citizen Watch, it was the smallest hard disk drive in the world at the time of its launch. Despite its innovative design, the Kittyhawk was ultimately a commercial failure due to its high cost.

== History ==
It was the first ever commercially produced hard drive in a 1.3-inch form factor. The original implementation (model 3013) had the capacity of 20 MB. A 40 MB model called Kittyhawk II (model 3014) was eventually introduced, with the retail price of $499. Both models have IDE interfaces. It appears that some variations of the hard drive were produced with PC card interface as well. The drive measured 2.0 by 1.44 by 0.414 inches (50.8 mm × 36.6 mm × 10.5 mm), and weighed about 1 ounce (28 g). It was manufactured by Citizen Corporation, at the time a leader in small device manufacturing. The drive featured a number of unique technologies, including a built-in accelerometer that protected the hard drive from falls. Kittyhawk was claimed to be able to survive a 3-foot (0.91 m) drop onto concrete while operating without loss of data.

Despite its remarkable characteristics, Kittyhawk turned out to be a commercial failure. It was not in demand from notebook industry due to its inferior cost per megabyte and capacity. A few OEM suppliers adopted the drive, including an early pen based computer maker EO, which ran the GO operating system. The handheld market failed to take off in early 1990s as expected. Many potential markets, such as the video game console market, were missed due to hard drive's high production costs.

Kittyhawk was discontinued by HP in September 1994. Approximately 160,000 units were actually sold compared to projected 2-year sales of 700,000 units. In 1996, largely due to Kittyhawk's failure, Hewlett-Packard closed its Disk Memory Division and exited the disk drive business.

The story of HP Kittyhawk is described in a Harvard Business School business case "Hewlett-Packard: The Flight of the Kittyhawk", and is a case study in the book The Innovator's Dilemma by Clayton M. Christensen.

== See also ==
- Microdrive - A 1-inch hard disk drive produced by IBM and Hitachi, released in 1999.
- List of disk drive form factors
