= SyQuest SparQ =

Removable-disk hard drive

The SparQ drive is a removable-disk hard drive made by SyQuest Technology. It was introduced in 1997, available as an internal or external version. The internal version utilized an IDE interface, and the external version used a parallel port. The disk can store 1 GB of data. As a removable-disk hard drive, it contains a solid hard disk platter on which the data is stored.

When the SparQ drive was launched, it was relatively cheap. Compared to the Zip drive whose 100 MB disk could cost US$22, a 1 GB SparQ disk could cost US$39 — slightly less than twice the cost for ten times the storage capacity.

== Quality issues ==
A few months after the launch, users began to complain that the drives had serious quality issues, causing them to break. The damage to its public image and warranty obligations of SyQuest were major factors behind the company's bankruptcy.

After its bankruptcy, SyQuest retained its rights to produce and sell the drive, which it continued to sell online directly to consumers. The price increased compared to when the drive was launched, so it was primarily for businesses that still relied on the drive and people who wanted to read old SparQ disks. By October 2008, the website was no longer active.

The SparQ had a serious failure mode which damaged SparQ disks in such a way that they would damage subsequent SparQ drives in which they were placed. Inserting a broken disk in a SparQ drive will cause the drive to break any new disks placed in that drive. These broken disks could break additional drives, breaking most of the drives in an office in short order.

== See also ==
- SyQuest EZ 135 Drive
- Castlewood Orb Drive
- Zip drive
- Jaz drive
- REV (disk)
- Bernoulli Box
- Ditto (drive)
- LS-120 drive
- Click of death
