= Avatar Systems =

Defunct American data storage company

Avatar Systems Corporation
- Logo of the company trading as Avatar Peripherals
- Type: Private
- Industry: Computer storage
- Founded: 1991; 35 years ago in Milpitas, California, United States
- Founders: John Bizjak; Dan Cautis
- Defunct: October 1998; 27 years ago
- Fate: Chapter 7 bankruptcy
- Number of employees: 140 (1997, peak)
- Website: avatarsystems.com at the Wayback Machine (archived 1999-02-08)

Avatar Systems Corporation, later trading as Avatar Peripherals, was an American computer hardware company based in Milpitas, California, active from 1991 to 1998. The company focused on the production of 2.5-inch cartridge hard disk drives, initially through computer system builders as an OEM, and subsequently directly to customers as a vendor.

== History ==
=== Foundation and early products (1991–1994) ===
Avatar Systems was founded in 1991 in Milpitas, California, by John Bizjak and Dan Cautis. From the outset, the company was focused on the market for cartridge hard disk drives, such as those sold by SyQuest Technology at the time. Such drives separated the read–write heads from the platters and encapsulated both in their own assemblies. This allowed the platters (which stored the data) to be swapped out for others effortlessly and stored safely in one's pocket. While similar removable media formats, such as floptical disks, were already on the market by the time Avatar was founded, such formats had not seen the exponential improvements to storage density and seek times that traditional Winchester-based drives had been witnessing. Given their prior expertise in the hard drive industry, the founders of Avatar settled on the 2.5-inch form factor as the most viable for their drives.

The company's first hard drive, the Remington ASR-80, had a storage capacity of 85 MB. Each cartridge measured 3 by 2.5 by 0.175 inches (76.2 by 63.5 by 4.4 mm) and contained one platter. Avatar contracted Hoya Electronics for manufacture of the platter, which measured 0.025 inches (0.64 mm) thick and was fabricated out of glass-ceramic coated with a thin magnetic film (1600 oersted). Since drive contamination was a concern, Avatar designed the drives with two-stage filtering and a "purge cycle" on initial spin-up—in which the drive quickly ramps up to 3600 RPM, before slowing down to normal operating RPM—to force any dust out. Avatar provided the drives at first only on an OEM basis, for system builders to resell and rebrand as needed. The company's first two customers in November 1992 were NCR Corporation (then a subsidiary of AT&T), who featured the ASR-80 in several of their high-end workstations, and Dauphin Technology, who used it in their Dauphin 550 laptop, rebranding it as the DynaDrive. In March 1993, Avatar introduced the Magnum ASR-80M, which combined the earlier ASR-80 with a standard 1.44-MB 3.5-inch floppy drive.

=== Crisis and turnaround (1994–1997) ===
The computing press characterized Avatar's rollout of their drives as "quiet". Despite Thai banks investing $25 million in the company, they had only gained one other customer, Olivetti, by early 1994. Shipments were so slow that in February or March 1994, a sales report tallied the number of drives shipped for the month at 35 units. Despite this, Avatar remained optimistic that they would ship at least 20,000 units by the year's end, with a new, 60,000-square-foot factory in Thailand set to produce 50,000 units per year in 1995. In March 1994, they gained two new customers, Hewlett-Packard and QMS.

However, by mid-1994, successor drives with higher capacities had failed to materialize, while sales had stalled completely. Around May or June 1994, the founders temporarily shut down operations while they looked for new executive talent. In October 1994, they hired Robert Martell, a veteran of Seagate Technology, who promptly laid off 50 of its 90 employees and hired several other ex-Seagate employees to round out the new executive team and develop a new product map. In November 1995, they re-materialized, announcing preliminary licensing deals with Apple, Intergraph, and Acer. In January 1996, they secured their first new design win in two years with Acer, who offered Avatar's new 130-MB removable cartridge hard drive (rebranded as the HARDiskette) on some of their laptop models. In May 1996, Avatar inked an agreement with laptop maker Mitsuba to supply them with the same drive. In January 1997 they delivered a 210-MB version of the HARDiskette.

=== Shark 250 and bankruptcy (1997–1998) ===
In March 1997, Avatar released the Shark 250, an external removable hard drive system featuring the company's newest 250-MB HARDiskette. The Shark features a two-tone gray case and a motorized eject for the catridge slot. It connects to the computer via a parallel cable and receives power, unusually, via an open PS/2 port; a parallel passthrough came included for using a parallel printer in tandem with the Shark, as well as a PS/2 passthrough to get back the occupied PS/2 port. The company also offered an internal version of the Shark 250, the AR-3210NS, for certain laptops. The Shark 250 received generally high marks in the computing press for its speediness and ease of use. PC Magazine deemed it superior to floptical while slightly slower than SyQuest's EZFlyer system. Windows Magazine praised its sturdy construction but found the potential throughput hampered by the use of a parallel connection. Avatar later offered a PC Card adapter for the Shark 250, allowing laptop users to obtain better transfer speeds. One major design flaw suffered by the Shark, mentioned in its manual, is a catastrophic failure of the head assembly should the drive reader unit be transported with a cartridge installed.

Avatar filed for Chapter 7 bankruptcy in October 1998, leaving numerous late adopters of the drive irate that a $50 rebate offered earlier in 1997 could not be cashed in.
