= Write protection =

Protection for the overwriting of data

IBM tape reel with white write ring in place, and an extra yellow ring

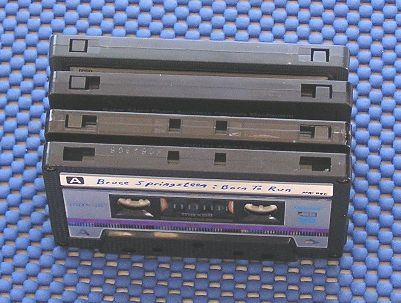
From top to bottom: an unprotected Type I cassette, an unprotected Type II, an unprotected Type IV, and a protected Type IV

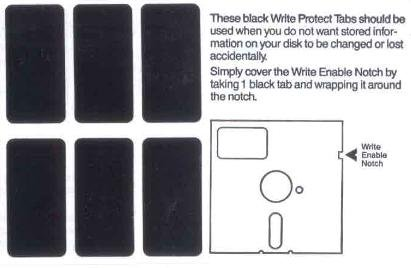
A sheet of 5 1/4" floppy disk write protect tabs

Write protection is any physical mechanism that prevents writing, modifying, or erasing data on a device. Most commercial software, audio and video on writeable media is write-protected when distributed.

== Examples ==
- IBM 1/2-inch magnetic tape reels, introduced in the 1950s, had a circular groove on one side of the reel, into which a soft plastic ring had to be placed in order to write on the tape. ("No ring, no write.")
- Audio cassettes and VHS videocassettes have tabs on the top/rear edge that can be broken off (uncovered = protected).
- 8 and 5 1/4-inch floppies can have, respectively, write-protect and write-enable notches on the right side (8-inch punched = protected; 5 1/4-inch covered/notch not present = protected). A common practice with single-sided floppies was to punch a second notch on the opposite side of the disk to enable use of both sides of the media, creating a flippy disk, so called because one originally had to flip the disk over to use the other side.
- 3 1/2-inch floppy disks have a sliding tab in a window on the right side (open = protected).
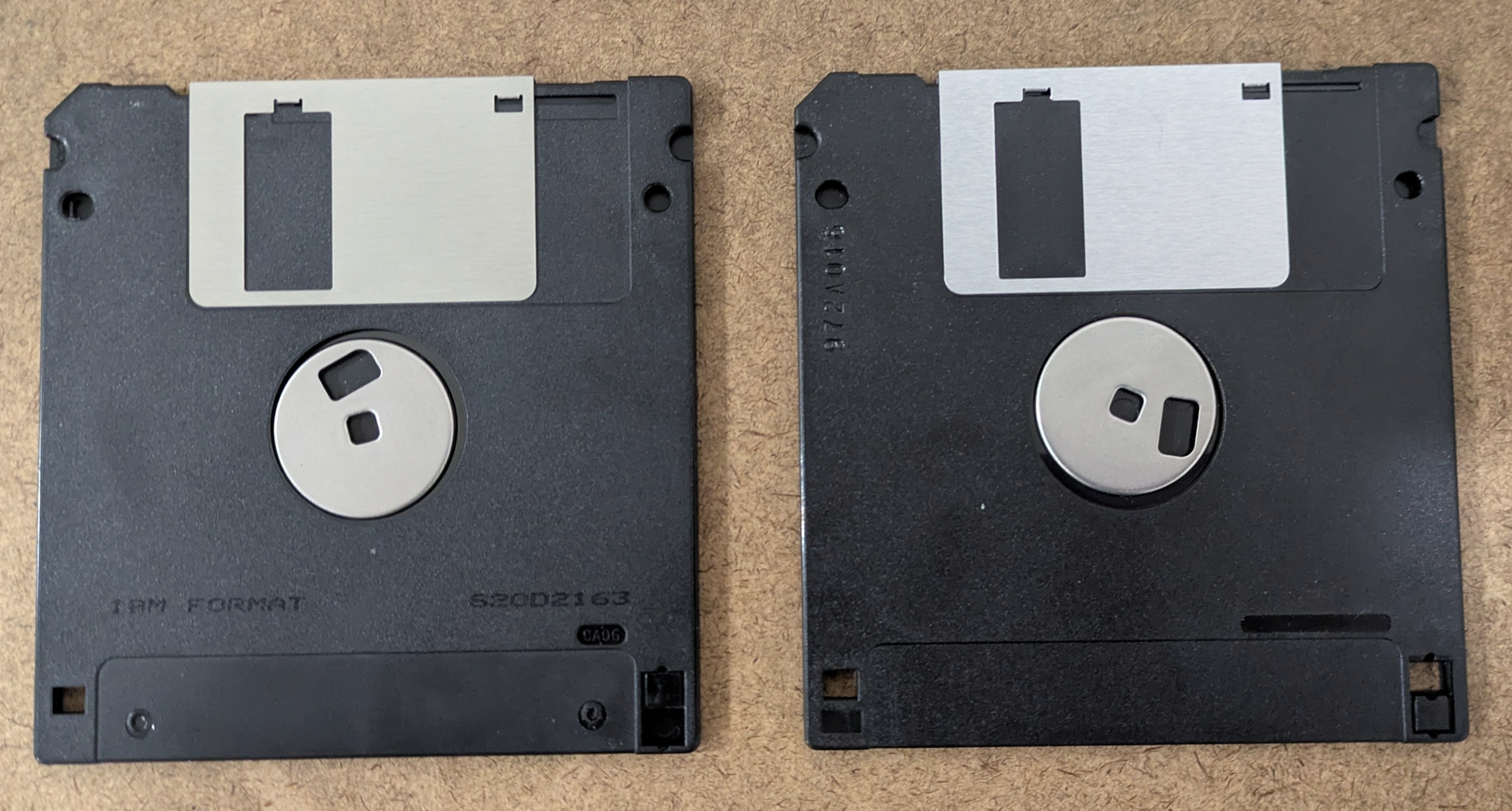
  Two 3 1/2-inch floppy disks, one with write-protection disabled (left) and one with write-protection enabled (right)
- Iomega Zip disks were write-protected using the IomegaWare software.
- Syquest EZ-drive (135 & 250 MB) disks were write-protected using a small metal switch on the rear of the disk at the bottom.
- VHS-C, Video8, Hi8, and DV videocassettes have a sliding tab on the rear edge.
- Iomega ditto tape cartridges had a small sliding tab on the top left hand corner on the front face of the cartridge.
- USB flash drives sometimes have a small switch, though this has become uncommon. An example of a USB flash drive that supported write protection via a switch is the Transcend JetFlash series.
- Secure Digital (SD) cards have a write-protect tab on the left side.
- Extensively, media that, by means of design, can't operate outside from this mode: CD-R, DVD-R, Vinyl records, etc.

These mechanisms are intended to prevent only accidental data loss or attacks by computer viruses. A determined user can easily circumvent them either by covering a notch with adhesive tape or by creating one with a punch as appropriate, or sometimes by physically altering the media transport to ignore the write-protect mechanism.

Write-protection is typically enforced by the hardware. In the case of computer devices, attempting to violate it will return an error to the operating system while some tape recorders physically lock the record button when a write-protected cassette is present.

== Write blocking ==
Write blocking, a subset of write protection, is a technique used in computer forensics in order to maintain the integrity of data storage devices. By preventing all write operations to the device, e.g. a hard drive, it can be ensured that the device remains unaltered by data recovery methods.

Hardware write blocking was invented by Mark Menz and Steve Bress (US patent 6,813,682 and EU patent EP1,342,145).

Both hardware and software write-blocking methods are used; however, software blocking is generally not as reliable, due to human error.

== See also ==
- Copyright infringement
- Bootleg recording
