= Nomaï =

Nomaï, S.A.
- Type: Privately held company
- Industry: Data Storage
- Founded: February 1, 1992
- Founder: Marc-André Frouin, Hervé Frouin
- Headquarters: Avranches, France
- Area served: US, France, Scotland
- Key people: Marc-André Frouin, Hervé Frouin
- Products: XHD cartridges, DUO, MCD cartridges
- Number of employees: 150 in production site (1999)

Nomaï, S.A. was a computer storage products manufacturer, based in Avranches, France. It was founded in 1992 and acquired by Iomega in 1998. The company was listed on the Paris Bourse with symbol NOMF.PA. In 1994, the company had a revenue of 70 million Francs. Many companies including EMTEC, Maxell, Memorex, Letraset, Fujifilm, BASF, Verbatim, and Lexmark sold products manufactured by Nomaï under OEM and distribution agreements.

The company had three subsidiaries, a research and design facility in Scotland, a factory in Albi, France and a sales office in the United States.

== Lawsuits ==
=== Iomega ===
- In 1997, Iomega filed suit against Nomaï for patent infringement and related issues concerning Nomaï's XHD 100 (Zip-compatible) floppy. A Paris court issued an injunction against Nomaï for making the product too similar in appearance to Iomega's Zip.
- That injunction ended in September 1997 and Nomaï responded by completing the acquisition of RPS Media (which included a 60,000 sq ft (5,600 m^{2}) floppy disk manufacturing plant in Albi, France). This factory was expected to greatly increase the production of the XHD media.
- There were several other lawsuits filed by Iomega in the second half of 1997 in France, Germany and the U.S.
- The lawsuits were only resolved in July 1998 when Iomega purchased a majority of Nomaï stock as well as the specific technology used to produce XHD and DUO media.
- Iomega closed the Avranches factory in 1999 after getting into financial difficulty.

=== SyQuest ===
- In 1993, SyQuest Technology filed suit against Nomaï for stealing technology and making similar data storage cartridges that work with the SyQuest 44 MB and 88 MB drives.
- In 1997, SyQuest filed another suit against Nomaï for making similar data storage media. This suit was resolved much more rapidly and amicably than the Iomega suit, but SyQuest and Nomaï both had trouble afterwards.
