= Ditto (drive) =

Magnetic tape data storage system

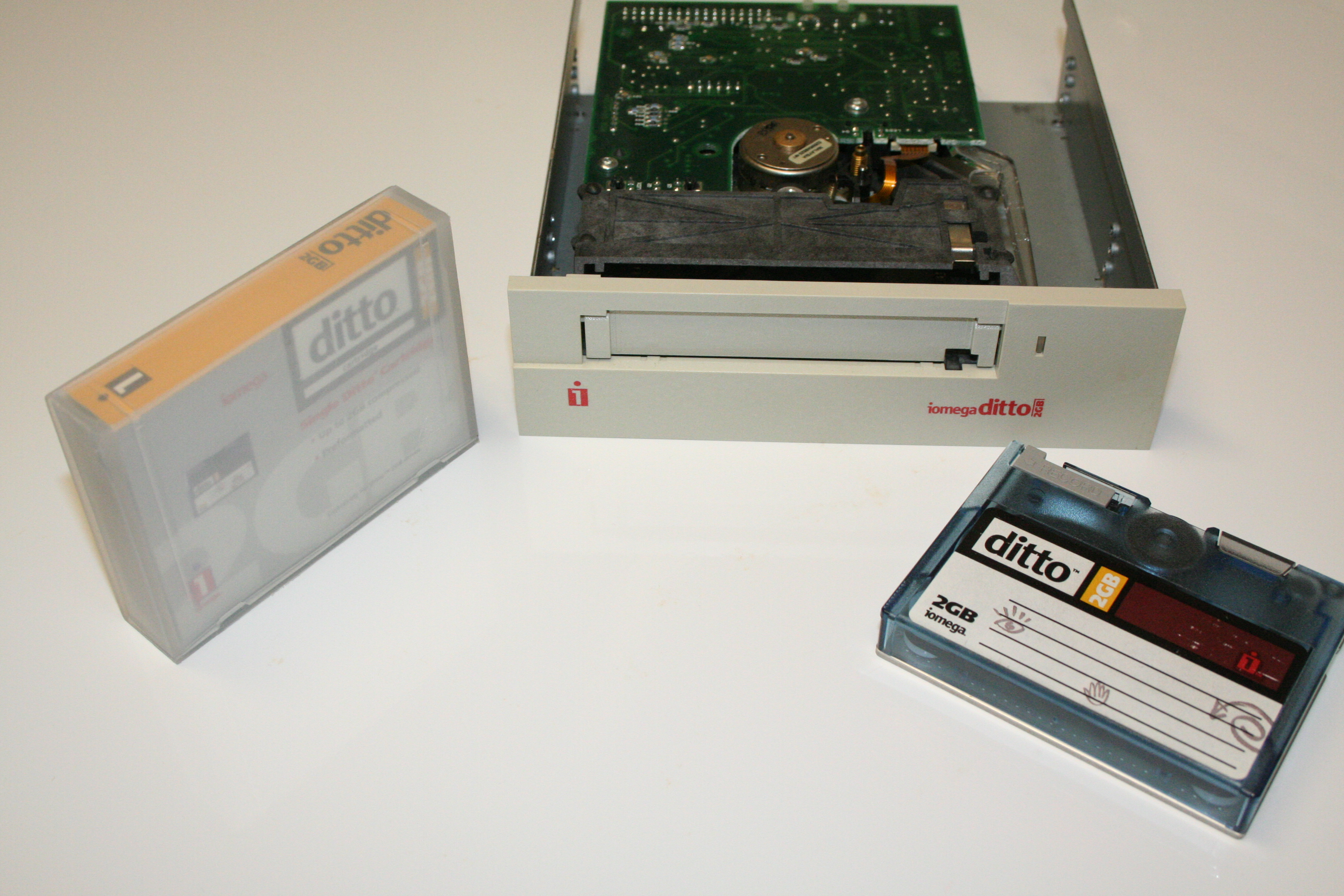
An Iomega Ditto internal drive with a 2GB tape and case.

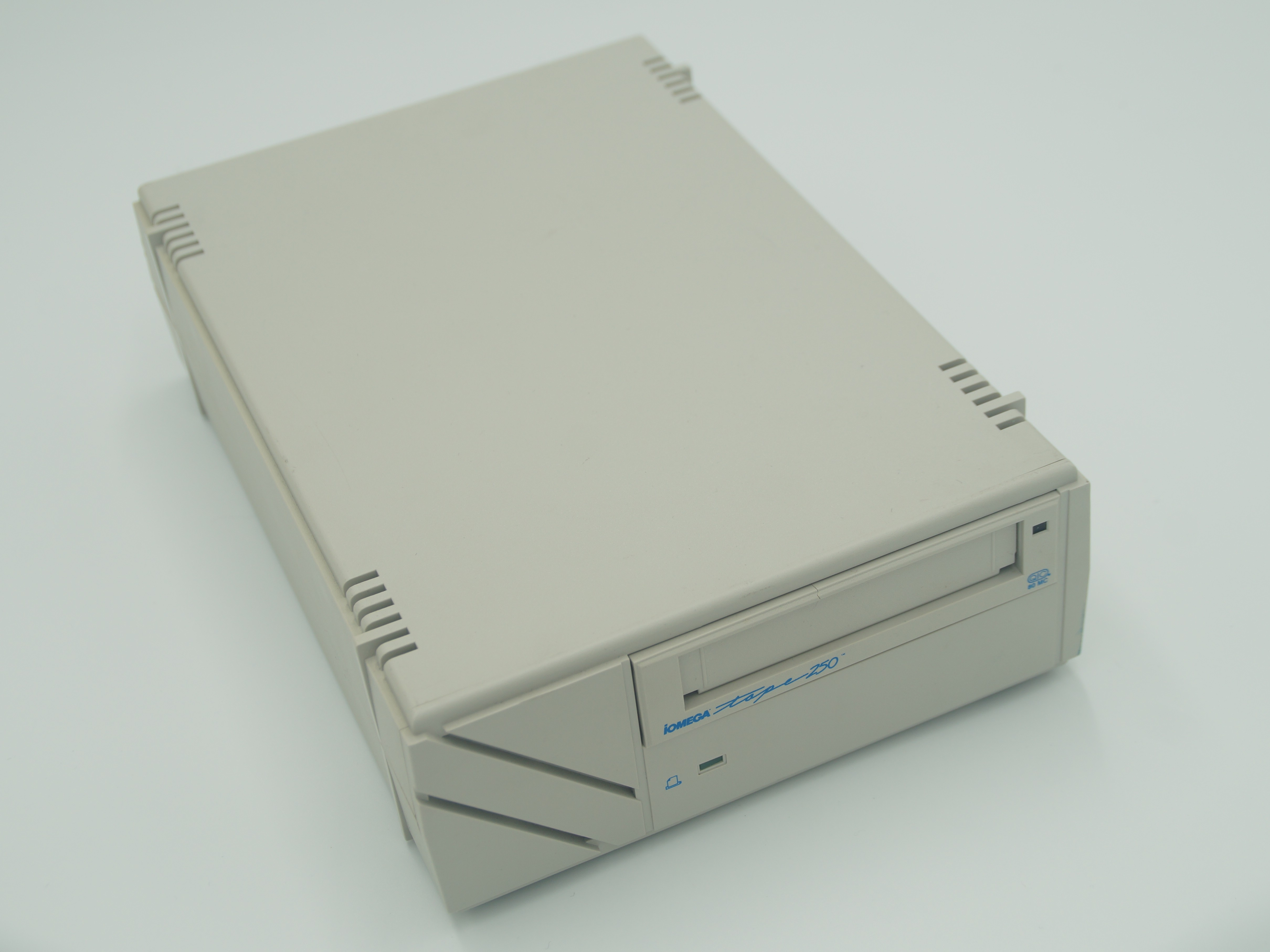
An earlier Iomega Tape 250 drive

The Ditto drive series was a proprietary magnetic tape data storage system released by Iomega during the 1990s. It was marketed as a tape backup device for personal computers.

They were released in several capacities ranging from the original Ditto 250 drive (250MB compressed capacity per cartridge) to the DittoMAX drive, a compatible format with compressed capacities up to 10GB per cartridge. This was accomplished by increasing the physical size of the cartridge (making it longer). Some versions of the drive were also able to read Travan-type tapes.

== Technical aspects ==
Ditto internal drives were connected through the floppy drive channel and used MFM encoding to store data (the same method as on older floppy drives). An ISA accelerator card called the Ditto Dash, providing higher speed than a stock floppy controller, was also available.

Ditto external drives were connected to the parallel port and offered a print-through port which allowed a printer to operate while daisy-chained to the Ditto drive. This is a feature also commonly found on an Iomega ZIP drive. Usage of the parallel port allowed for transfer speeds (in EPP mode) of a maximum 1 MB/s.

== Discontinuation ==
In 1999, Iomega sold the Ditto brand and technology to Tecmar and exited the tape drive business.

The Ditto series has been discontinued. The need for higher capacities has made the Ditto series obsolete. The slow bandwidth of the Ditto also limited its usefulness compared to the Iomega REV or the older (and discontinued) Iomega Jaz.

== Models ==
- Tape 250 - Released in 1992. Compatible with Irwin's EZTape

=== Compatibility between tapes and drives ===
	QIC											Travan			Iomega Ditto					
	2080	2120	2120XL	QW5122	3000	3000XL	3010XL	3010XLF	3020	3020XL	3020XLF	TR-1	TR-2	TR-3	2GB	Max 3GB	3.7GB	Max 5GB	Max 7GB	Max 10GB
Tape 250	R/W/F	R/W/F	R/W																	
Tape 420	R/W/F	R/W/F	R/W/F	R/W/F																
Ditto 800	R/W/F	R/W/F	R/W/F	R/W/F								R/W/F								
Ditto 510		R	R		R/W/F	R/W/F														
Ditto 700		R	R		R/W/F	R/W/F														
Ditto 850		R	R	R	R/W/F		R/W/F	R/W/F												
Ditto 1700		R	R	R	R/W/F		R/W/F	R/W/F	R/W/F	R/W/F	R/W/F									
Ditto 3200	R	R	R	R			R	R	?	R/W/F	R/W/F	R	R	R/W/F						
Ditto 2GB	R	R	R	R			R	R	?	R/W/F	R/W/F	R	R	R/W/F	R/W		R/W			
Ditto Max									R	R	R				R	R/W	R	R/W	R/W	R/W
Ditto Max Professional									R	R	R				R	R/W	R	R/W	R/W	R/W

Notes:

R - read capable
W - write capable
F - format capable

- The capacity figures used in the product names above are double the actual (native) capacity. Iomega and other manufacturers assume 2:1 data compression.
- Ditto Max requires version 3.2 Pro of the Iomega backup software to support the Ditto Max 10GB tape cartridge.
- Above data gathered from.
