= PocketZip =

Floppy disk storage system

The PocketZip is a medium-capacity floppy disk storage system introduced by Iomega in 1999. It uses very small 54.5mm x 50.2mm x 2.0mm 40 MB disks. It was originally known as the "Clik!" drive until the click of death class action lawsuit regarding mass failures of Iomega's original Zip drives, after which it was renamed "PocketZip". In 2001, the company announced bigger-capacity 100 MB disks, which were never released.

== PocketZip drive and media ==
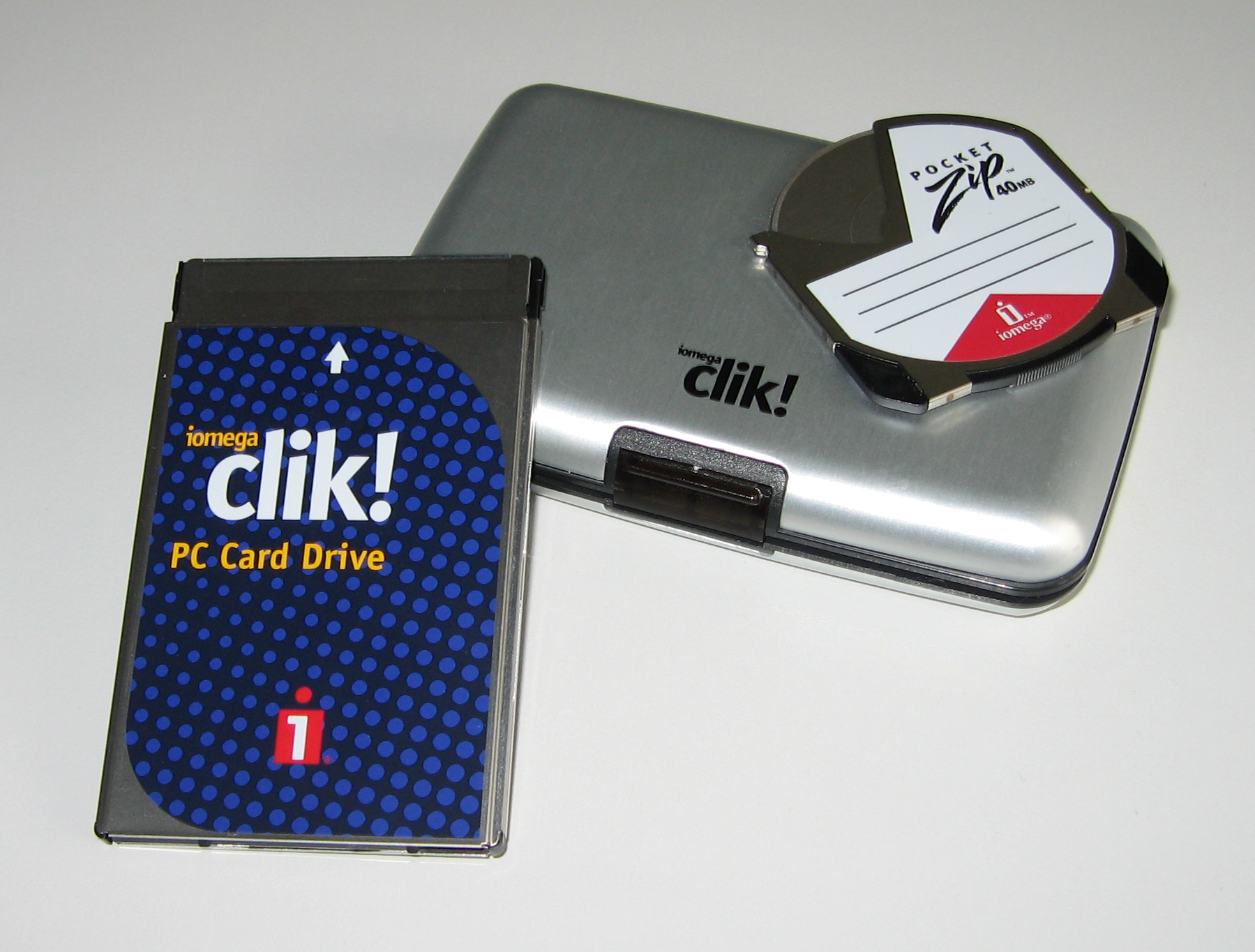
Iomega Clik! PocketZip Drive and Media

The PocketZip drive was available originally as a laptop PC Card (PCMCIA) slot drive where it could compete with contemporary PC Card, MicroDrive, CompactFlash and SmartMedia readers. A dock was available to connect this drive to a desktop computer's parallel port. Later, a USB version of the drive was also offered. It was marketed as a backup and portable storage solution, similar to the original Zip drive, but which could be installed completely inside a laptop computer, as PC Cards typically slide completely inside the laptop computer and thus do not increase its dimensions, which also precludes the need for a power supply or cables.

The PocketZip media is a small, flexible disk inside of a thin metal casing, similar to that found on the shutter of a standard floppy disk. The disks usually came in small format-specific plastic cases, and the drive was also shipped for a while with a small hard metal case - identical, but unrelated to the Aluma Wallet - which could house the drive and two disks. The disks could be bent easily if too much force was applied, thereby completely damaging them.

== Use in consumer electronics ==
The format was also used in a small number of consumer electronics devices such as MP3 players and digital cameras. These include the Iomega HipZip Digital Audio Player, the Sensory Science Rave MP 2300, and the Agfa ePhoto CL30 Clik. The format saw use in other devices as well but proved to be a commercial failure. It suffered heavy competition from flash-based memory cards. The PocketZip was electro-mechanical and, hence, not as reliable as solid-state flash memory cards which have no moving parts. Also, as the capacity and speed of flash memory storage increased and its costs decreased, the PocketZip lost viability as a portable storage solution.

== Specifications ==
(from Iomega support site):

- Capacity: 40 MB
- Seek Time: 38 ms
- Sustained transfer rate: Up to 600 KB/s
- Rotational speed: 2,941 rpm
- Short format time: 10 seconds
- Long format time: 5 minutes
- Average start/stop time: 3 seconds
- Disk shelf life: 10 years

=== Operating system support ===
According to the original documentation, Pocket Zip USB and PC Card work with Windows 95, Windows 98/98SE and Windows NT 4.0. Iomega provided USB mass storage support for Windows 95 with at least OSR2 (4.00.950B) for use with its Zip products. Under Windows NT 4, Pocket Zip PC Card only works with certain PC Card controllers (which ones are not named by Iomega). Pocket Zip USB also works with Mac OS 8.x, but the PC Card version is specified as not working with Apple computers.

In practice, the USB drive is a standard mass storage device, so it will also work on any modern operating system which can use such devices, including Windows XP, Vista and 7, Mac OS X and Linux. The PC Card drive, similarly, is a standard removable ATA device, so it also will typically function without any problems on modern operating systems including Windows XP. The problem on the latest operating systems is unavailability or incompatibility of the software used to operate the proprietary features of the drive, such as low-level formatting and the software write protection.

== Devices that use the PocketZip format ==
- PocketZip PC Card Drive
- PocketZip USB Drive
- HipZip Digital Audio Player (Iomega-branded MP3 player)
- Sensory Science Rave MP 2300 (MP3 player with voice recording and minimal PIM viewer functionality)
- Agfa ePhoto CL30 Clik! (Digital camera which uses PocketZip media for storage)
