= SyQuest EZ 135 Drive =

Removable hard disk drive

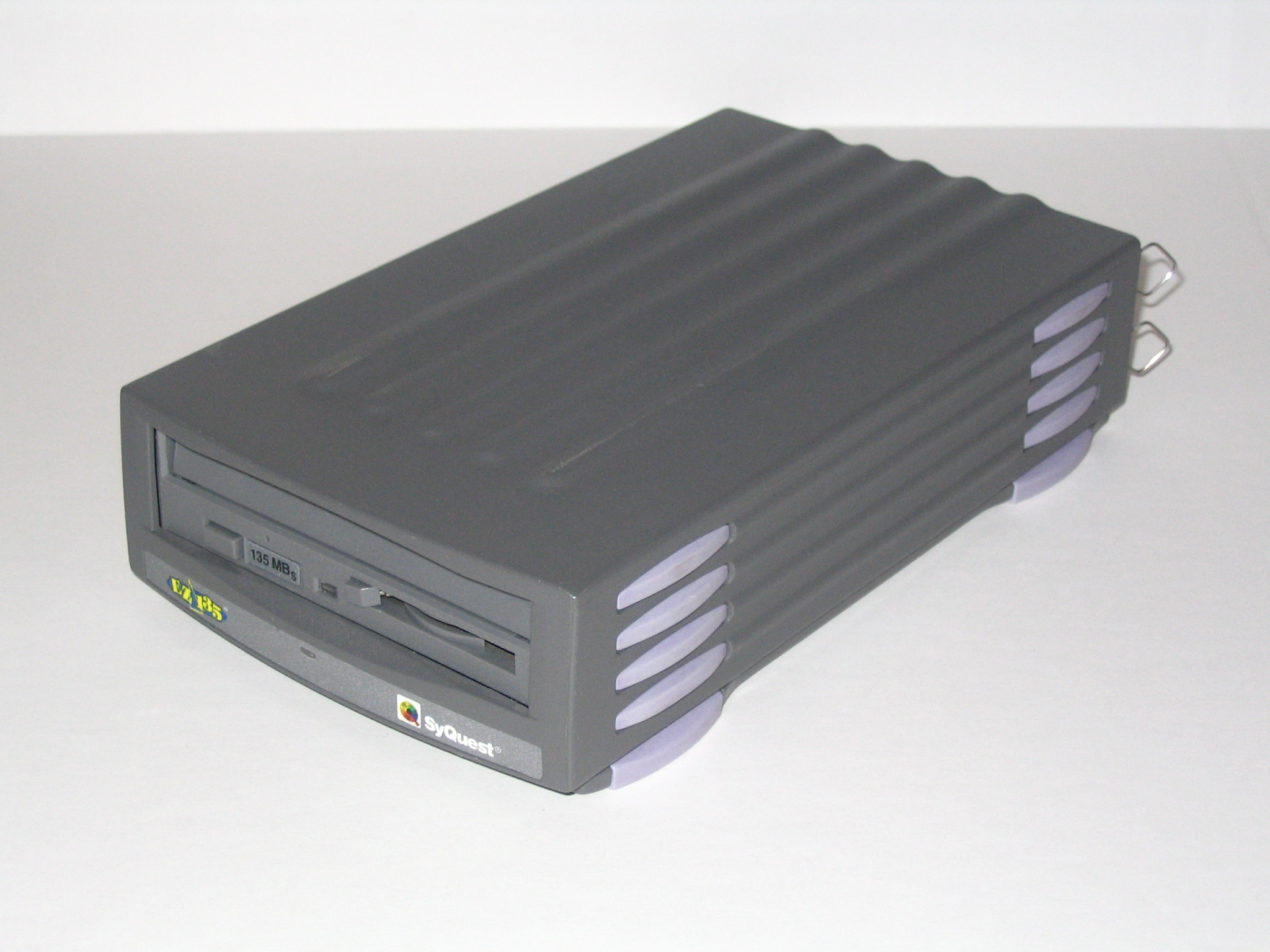
SyQuest EZ 135 Drive - External SCSI

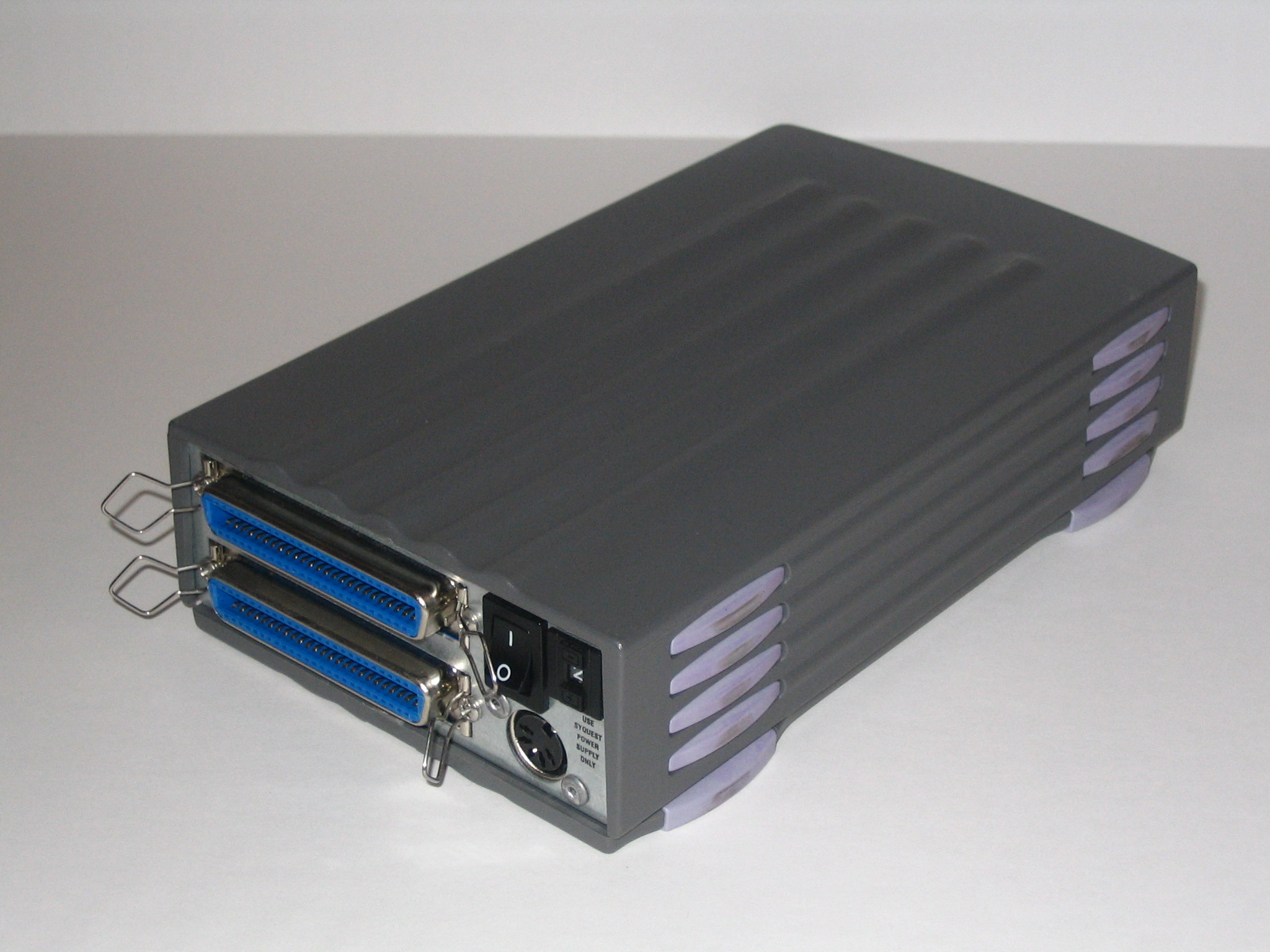
SyQuest EZ 135 Drive - External SCSI - Back

The EZ 135 Drive is a 3.5" removable-platter hard disk drive. It was introduced by SyQuest Technology in 1995. It had a maximum capacity of 135 MB per disk.

A successor drive, known as the SyQuest EZFlyer, was released in 1996. It was backwards compatible with the EZ 135 disks, and could utilize a higher capacity 230 MB disk.

== Specifications ==
- Capacity: 135 MB
- Average seek time: 13.5 ms
- Burst transfer rate: 4 MB/s
- Buffer size: 64K
- Mechanism rated for 200,000 hours

== Interfaces ==
The EZ 135 drive was available with several interfaces. The external drive was available with parallel or SCSI interfaces; the internal drive was available with IDE or SCSI interfaces.

== Pricing ==
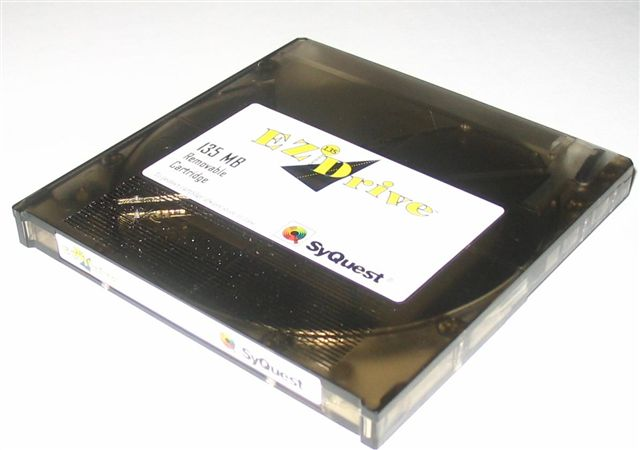
SyQuest EZ 135 cartridge

At introduction in 1995, the EZ 135 drive had the following prices:

- 135 MB cartridge: US$20 (equivalent to $41 in 2024)
- External SCSI drive: US$240 (equivalent to $495 in 2024)
- Internal IDE drive: US$200 (equivalent to $413 in 2024)

== Sales ==
The EZ 135 Drive was designed to be a competitor to the Iomega Zip drive and LS-120 SuperFloppy. The original box listed several advantages:

- Much faster
- Higher capacity
- 2-year warranty

Additionally the removable hard disk cartridges included a 5-year warranty.

Unfortunately, the EZ 135 drive was not backwards compatible with other SyQuest drives, and the original capacity was never increased beyond 135 MB. The Zip drive became popular and SyQuest's sales declined.

== See also ==
- SyQuest Technology
- Zip drive
- Jaz drive
- Orb Drive
