= Bernoulli Box =

Removable floppy disk storage system

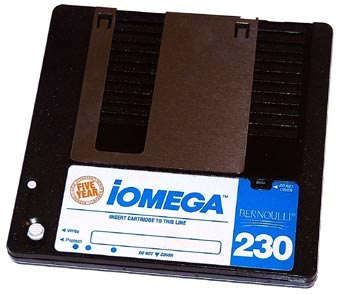
230 MB Bernoulli disk

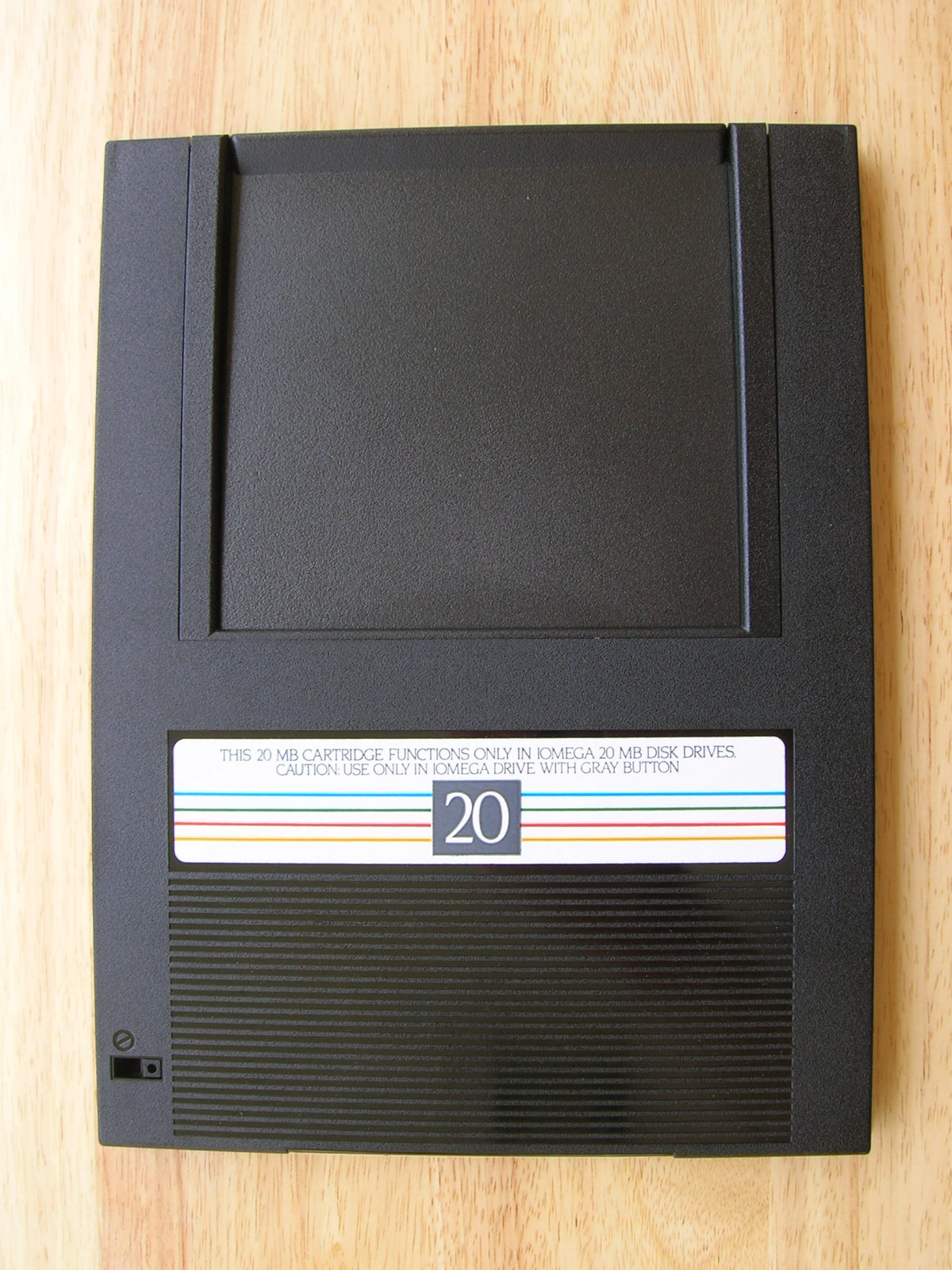
20 MB Bernoulli disk

The Bernoulli Box (or simply Bernoulli, named after Bernoulli's principle) is a high-capacity (at the time of release) removable disk storage system that was Iomega's first widely known product. It was first released in 1982.

== Overview ==
The original Bernoulli Box "Alpha-10" is a 10 megabyte (MB) removable disk drive that spins a disk made of PET film at about 1500 rpm, 1 μm above a read-write head. Utilizing Bernoulli's principle, the rotation of the disk pulls the flexible disk media down towards the read/write head, and will continue to do so for as long as the disk is spinning. This was in an attempt to make the Bernoulli drive more reliable than a contemporaneous hard disk drive, since a head crash is made physically impossible: should the disk stop spinning for any reason, it immediately pulls away from the read/write head, preventing damage.

The Bernoulli Box was released in capacities of 10 MB and, later, 20 MB, and its cartridges measure 8.23 in × 11.02 in × 0.71 in (20.9 cm × 28.0 cm × 1.8 cm), about the size of a standard piece of letter paper (albeit thicker). Bernoulli Boxes could be configured at time of purchase for either one or two drives within a single enclosure. A drive subsystem can be connected to a host computer via a proprietary interface card that utilizes a 37-pin SCSI connector.

In 1985, a 5 MB, RS-422 serial version of the Bernoulli Box, specific to the original Macintosh and Macintosh 512K, was released. The cartridges for this Macintosh-only version have a smaller capacity of just 5 MB. However, they are also physically smaller than their predecessors, measuring just 5.5 in × 7.4 in × 0.53 in (14.0 cm × 18.8 cm × 1.3 cm). With the release of the Macintosh Plus in 1986 (and its on-board SCSI interface), the 5 MB Bernoulli Box was quickly discontinued, and the 10 MB and 20 MB versions were adapted for the Macintosh Plus's 25-pin SCSI connector.

The most popular system was the Bernoulli Box II, whose cartridges are 5.35 in × 5.51 in × 0.35 in (13.6 cm × 14 cm × 0.9 cm), somewhat resembling a standard 5¼-inch floppy disk. The Bernoulli Box II was initially released with just a 20 MB capacity, but was quickly followed up by drives with capacities of 44 MB, then 90 MB (with varying levels of backwards compatibility). Eventually, a so-called "MultiDisk" drive was released which sported a maximum capacity of 150 MB, but which could also read and write without penalty to other "MultiDisk" cartridges, specifically: 35 MB, 65 MB, and 105 MB, in addition to 150 MB. By 1993, a Bernoulli Box was released that boosted the maximum capacity to 230 MB while also backwards compatible with most previous capacities (albeit at a performance penalty).

Leading Edge Products bundled Bernoulli Box II with its popular Leading Edge Model D computer as the "Infinite Memory System". Bernoulli Box II drives were sold as either internal units which fit into standard 5¼-inch drive bays, or as external units, with either one or two drives within a self-contained enclosure, similar to the original Bernoulli Box, and which connected to the host computer via the external SCSI connector. All versions of the Bernoulli Box II use a SCSI interface, but external drives can also be converted for use with a parallel port interface using a special adapter.

Cartridges for both the original Bernoulli Box, as well as the Bernoulli Box II, have a physical switch on them, analogous to that of a standard 3½-inch floppy disk, in order to enable and disable write protection.

== Reception ==
By 1986 Iomega had reportedly sold more than 70,000 Bernoulli Boxes, and more than one million $80 cartridges for them.

PC Magazine in 1984 stated that the Bernoulli Box "... combines the advantages of [standard] floppy- and hard-disk systems without their drawbacks." It reported no software-compatibility problems and cited the box's durable design. Bruce Webster of BYTE wrote favorably of the peripheral in February 1986, reporting that "I have not had a single glitch or lost file" in nine months of constant use.

== Successors ==
Iomega's later removable-storage products such as the Zip drive and Jaz and Rev removable hard disks did not use the Bernoulli technology.
