= Orb Drive =

Defunct American removable storage manufacturer

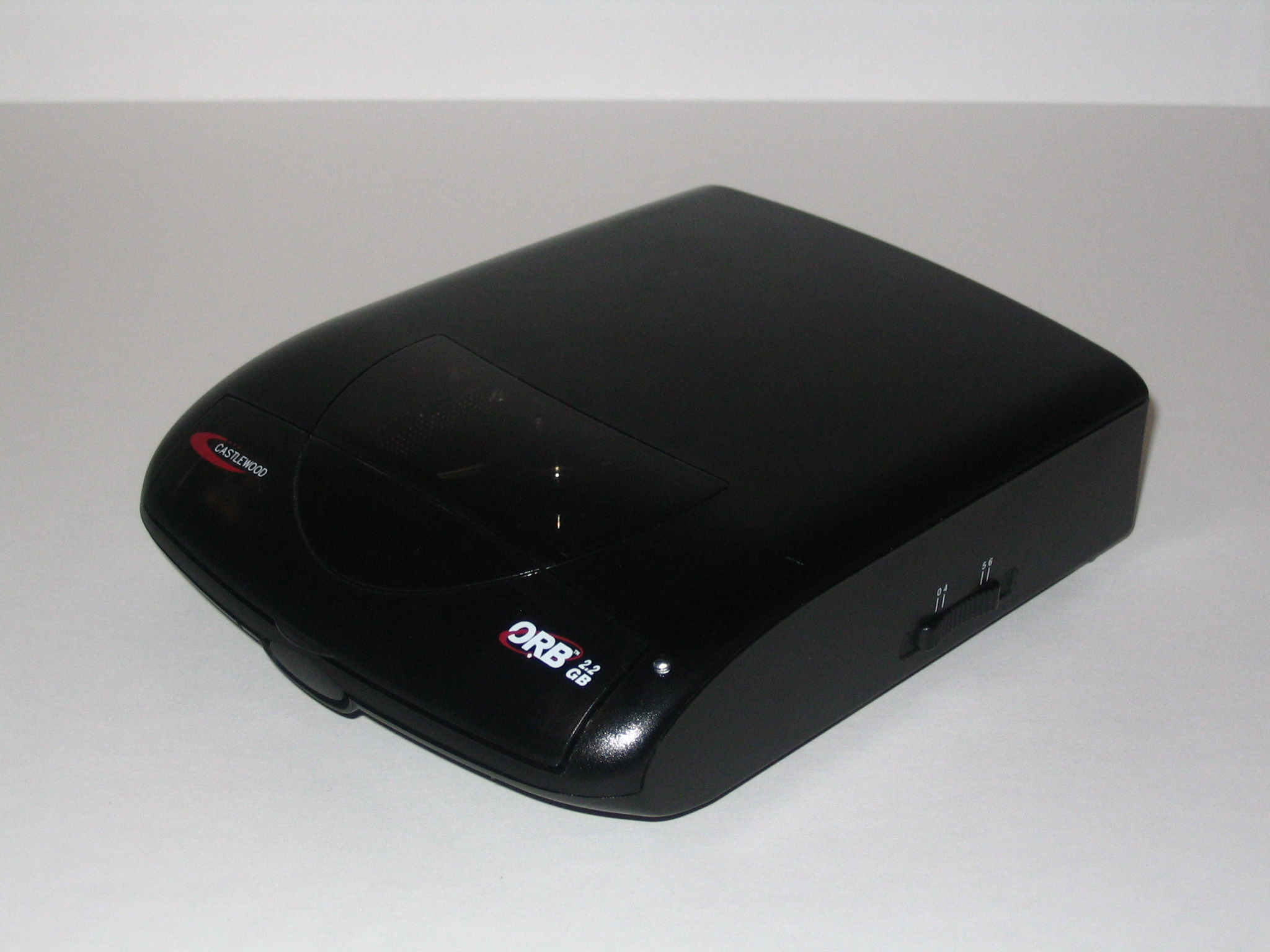
Orb Drive – external SCSI

The Orb Drive is a 3.5-inch removable hard-disk drive introduced by Castlewood Systems in 1999. Its original capacity was 2.2 GB. A later version of the drive was introduced in 2001 with a capacity of 5.7 GB. Manufacturing of this product ceased in 2004.

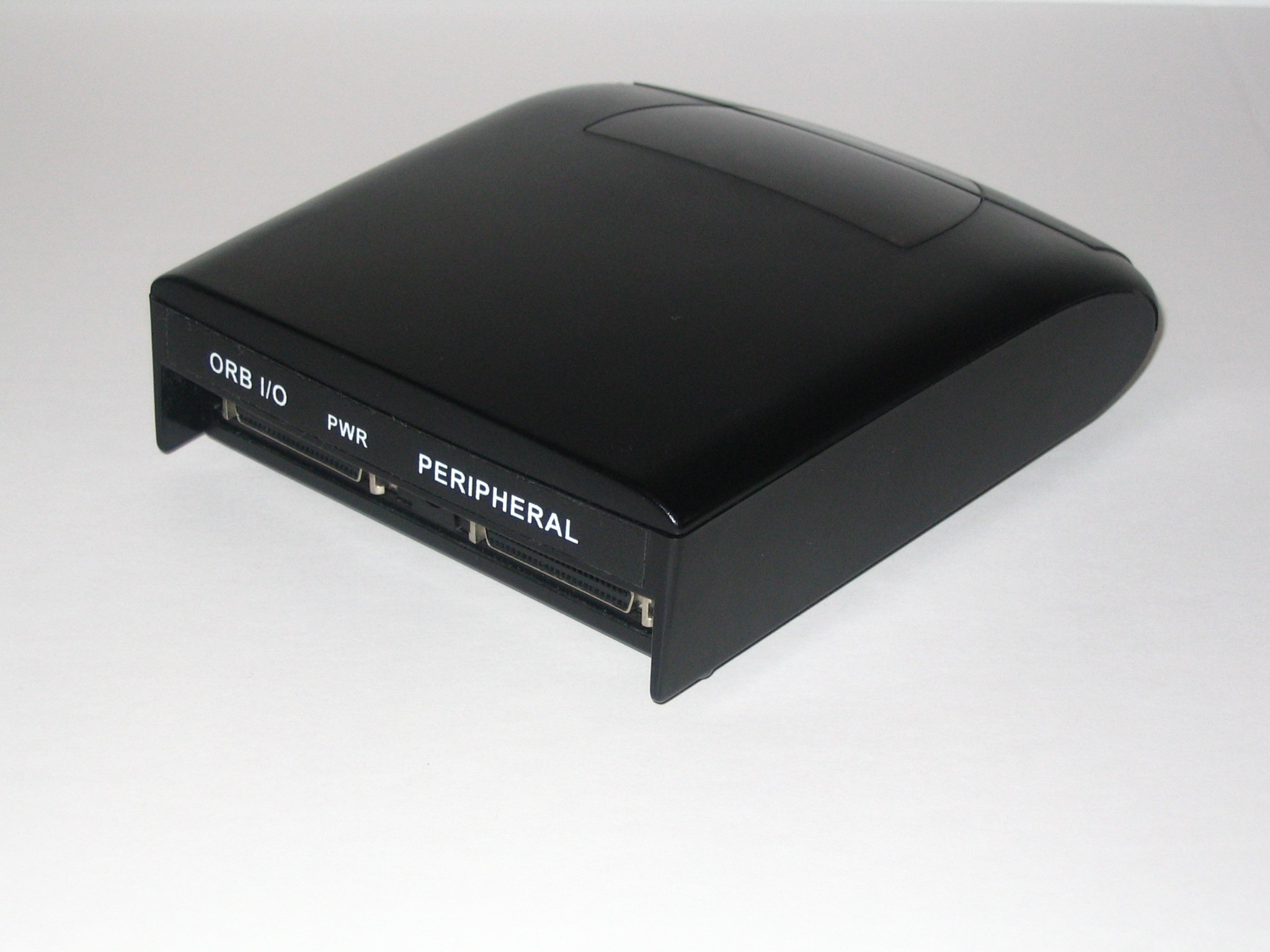
Orb Drive – external SCSI – back

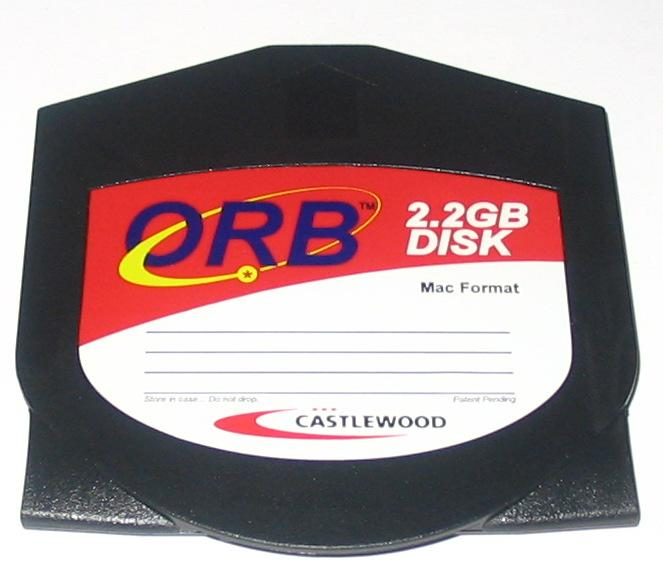
Orb Drive – 2.2 GB cartridge

== Castlewood Systems ==
The manufacturer of the Orb Drive was Castlewood Systems. It was formed by several former employees of SyQuest Technologies in 1996. Shortly after the Orb Drive was released, SyQuest brought a lawsuit against Castlewood.

Castlewood filed for Chapter 7 bankruptcy and ceased operation in 2004.

== Interfaces ==
The Orb Drive was available in internal and external versions. The internal version was available with IDE or SCSI interfaces. The external version was available with parallel, SCSI, USB, or FireWire interfaces.

== 2.2 GB drive specifications ==
This removable-disk drive was quiet in operation and incorporated several notable features:

- The SCSI identity could be altered with a screwdriver. A recessed control located under the unit allowed one of four settings (0, 4, 5 or 6).
- The Orb had a protective cover over the front of the unit, completely encasing the data disk. Closure of the cover allowed air to be purged for reading and writing operations. A button located at the centre of the front panel raised the cover for insertion or removal of a disk as shown in the adjacent picture (97 mm wide × 103 mm high × 7 mm deep). Disks were fed into the front of the drive and pressed down lightly to engage them with the drive mechanism. Seconds afterwards the lid would flip back down.
- The Orb was encased completely in smoked transparent plastic through which the power/activity light shined (steady green/flashing amber or flashing red) as disks were loaded, tested and unloaded. It was also possible to follow movements of the read and write mechanism through the top panel at the rear of the unit.
- The C/H/S parameters are: 4273/16/63

Orb disks were made in Malaysia and Thailand and formatted for Macintosh or IBM compatible computers. Disks arrived in a transparent plastic protective case that was shrink-wrapped and enclosed in a cardboard slip case.

The Model ORB2SE00 drive (with Model 777-052000S-KF power adapter) was compatible with the then contemporary PC and Mac hardware and operating systems. During the Orb drive's general period of relevance, two different SCSI/USB adapter configurations were provided by Castlewood:

1. The first used two adapters, one to connect the drive's female HD50 "SCSI IN" socket to a female DB25 socket into which a male DB25 plug to USB cable attached;
2. The second was Castlewood's own adapter "The ORB USB Smart Cable" Part Number 88205-001 (Male HD50 SCSI to USB). This single unit had two manually operated locking pins to keep it firmly connected. The attached USB cable had a clear transparent cover incorporating eight toroidal ceramic surge suppressing magnets close to the adapter.

== 5.7 GB drive specifications ==
- Capacity: 5.7 GB
- Transfer rate: 17.35 MB/s sustained, 66 MB/s burst
- Average seek time: 11 ms read/12 ms write
- Rotation speed: 5,400 rpm
- Drive head: GMR (Giant Magneto-Resistive)
- CPU: 30 MIPS DSP
- Start/Stop times: 25 seconds to start, 8 seconds to stop (including eject) on average
- Operating system compatibility: Windows 98, Windows 98SE, Windows NT 4.0 (SP4+), Windows 2000, Windows ME, Mac OS 8.6+
- Drive life: 5 years
- Estimated disk shelf life: 20 years
- Warranty: 1 year limited

The 5.7 GB drive could also read the 2.2 GB cartridges.

== See also ==
- Jaz drive
- SyQuest EZ 135 Drive
- SyQuest SparQ drive
- USB flash drive
- Zip drive
