= RDX (disk) =

Removable storage format

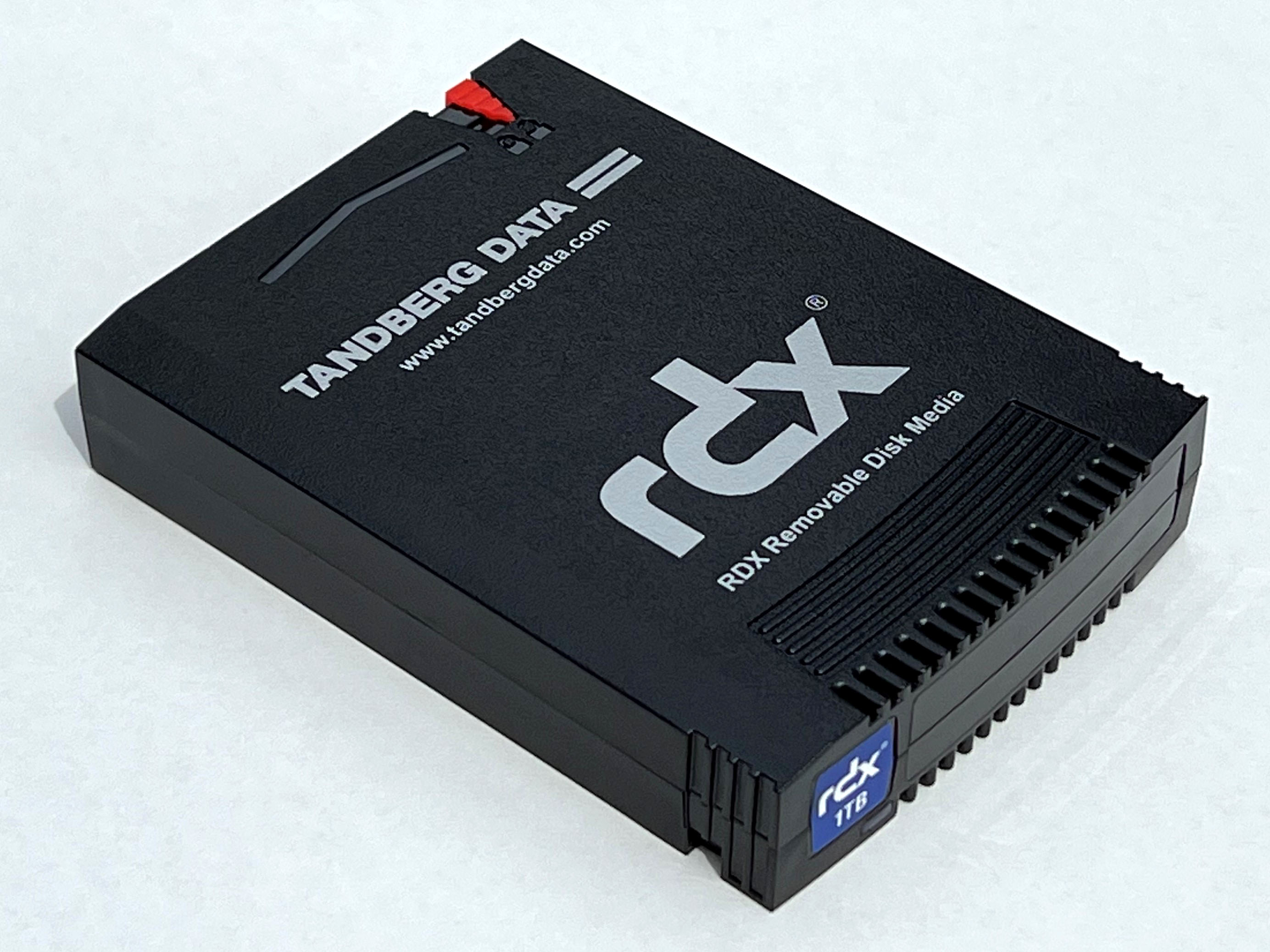
An RDX cartridge

RDX is a disk-based removable storage format intended as a replacement of tape storage. RDX removable disk technology consists of portable disk cartridges and an RDX dock. RDX cartridges are shock-proof 2.5-inch Serial ATA hard disk drives and are advertised to sustain a 1 meter (39 in) drop onto a concrete floor and to offer an archival lifetime up to 30 years and transfer up to 650GB/hr.

The technology was developed by ProStor Systems Incorporated in 2004. In May 2011, Tandberg Data GmbH of Germany acquired the RDX business including intellectual property and key members of ProStor's RDX engineering team.

Hard disk cartridges capacities are 320 GB, 500 GB, 1 TB, 1.5 TB, 2 TB, 3 TB, 4 TB, and 5 TB. Solid-state cartridges' capacities run from 64 GB to 512 GB per medium, doubling each increment; or as WORM media from 320 GB to 1 TB. Dell markets RDX cartridges under the trade name RD1000; a teardown reveals they contain a standard laptop drive enclosed with silicone bumpers, but the drive cannot be accessed if removed from the cartridge and interfaced by another means.

RDX is sometimes compared with Iomega REV, a formerly competing technology. Both technologies allow an ordinary user to remove and replace the cartridge containing the recording medium without special training. However REV places the read/write heads in the drive instead of inside the cartridge, which means that the drive's loading/unloading mechanism must mechanically insert heads into and remove them from the cartridge through a physical hole. By eliminating the need for this, RDX turns the drive into a dock—whose loading mechanism simply establishes an electronic connection to the cartridge.

== See also ==
- Linear Tape-Open
- Optical Disc Archive
