= REV (disk) =

Hard disk storage system

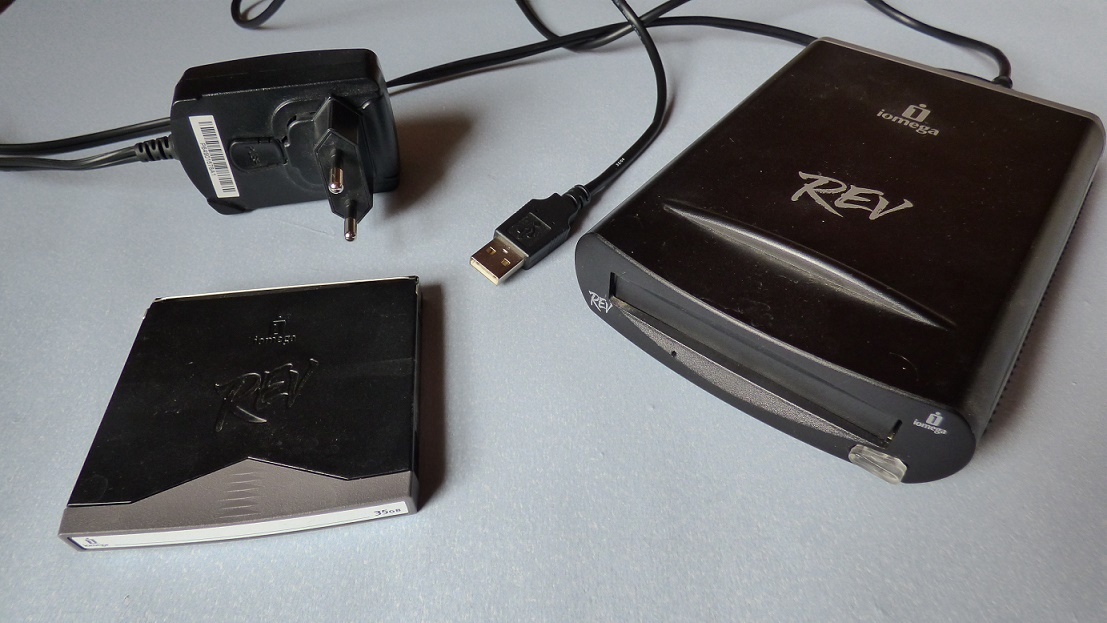
REV 35 GB removable disk with external USB reader

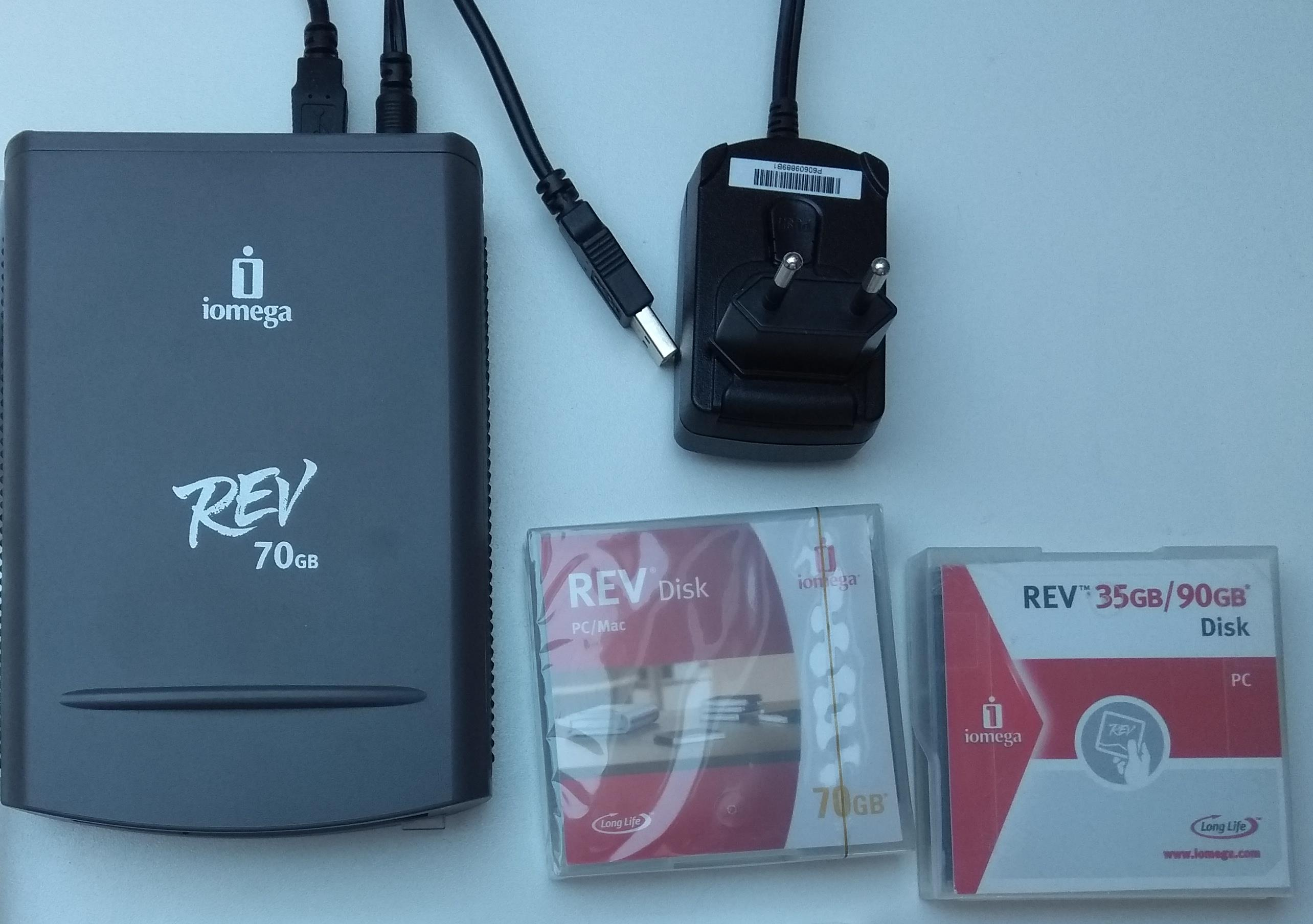
REV 70 GB USB reader with external disks

REV is a removable hard disk storage system from Iomega, released in 2004.

The small removable disks store 35, 70, or 120 gigabytes (GB) and are hard-drive technology. Like a standard hard drive, the REV system uses a flying head to read and write data to a spinning platter. The removable disks contain the platter, spindle, and motor, while the drive heads and drive controller are contained within the REV drive. The drives allow for data transfer rates of about 25 megabytes (MB) per second.

The REV was available as an external desktop model with FireWire, SCSI or USB 2.0 interfaces, an internal model with SCSI, ATAPI, or SATA interfaces, or an external server model which features a cartridge autoloader and SCSI interface. Iomega also offered a 320 GB network-attached storage appliance which features a built-in REV. The drives are compatible with Macintosh, Windows, and Linux operating systems, although some only with particular models or interfaces.

This product, especially the server model, was marketed as a replacement of tape drive technology for enterprise data backup, with claims of higher reliability, greater speed, and random access capability.

The REV was in many ways a successor to Iomega's Jaz drive, which uses a similar removable hard-disk-platter concept. However the Jaz design does not put the drive motor in the disk case.

The disks are formatted with the UDF file system on Windows and Unix/Linux. On Apple systems, they may be formatted as HFS+ or UDF in Mac OS X.

A seemingly-similar competing technology is RDX. A key distinction, however, is that the REV drive heads and drive controller remain inside the drive when the hard-disk platter is removed from it. In RDX, the drive heads are contained within the cartridge along with the platter and are removed along with it.

The drives suffer from poor reliability and high failure rates of both the disk mechanism and power supply units (on the external versions). Faced with cheaper, smaller, higher capacity and more reliable USB 2.5" portable hard drives, the REV format was discontinued:

- 35 GB - August 31, 2009
- 70 GB - December 14, 2009
- 120 GB - January 25, 2010

== See also ==
- Castlewood Orb Drive
- Universal Disk Format
