= Click of death =

Computing term that indicates storage failure

Click of death
The click of death of a failed Iomega Zip drive.

Click of death
Western Digital hard drive with click of death caused by a head crash

Click of death is a term that had become common in the late 1990s referring to the clicking sound in disk storage systems that signals a disk drive has failed, often catastrophically.

The phrase "click of death" originated to describe a failure mode of Zip drives sold by Iomega, appearing in print as early as January 30, 1998. (Note: In his podcast of September 18, 2008, Mac journalist Tim Robertson claimed to have coined the phrase in an article he wrote about problems with his Zip drives, and the phrase was subsequently repeated by David Pogue in Macworld.) Usage in the context of a hard disk drive appeared by February 9, 1998.

== Background ==
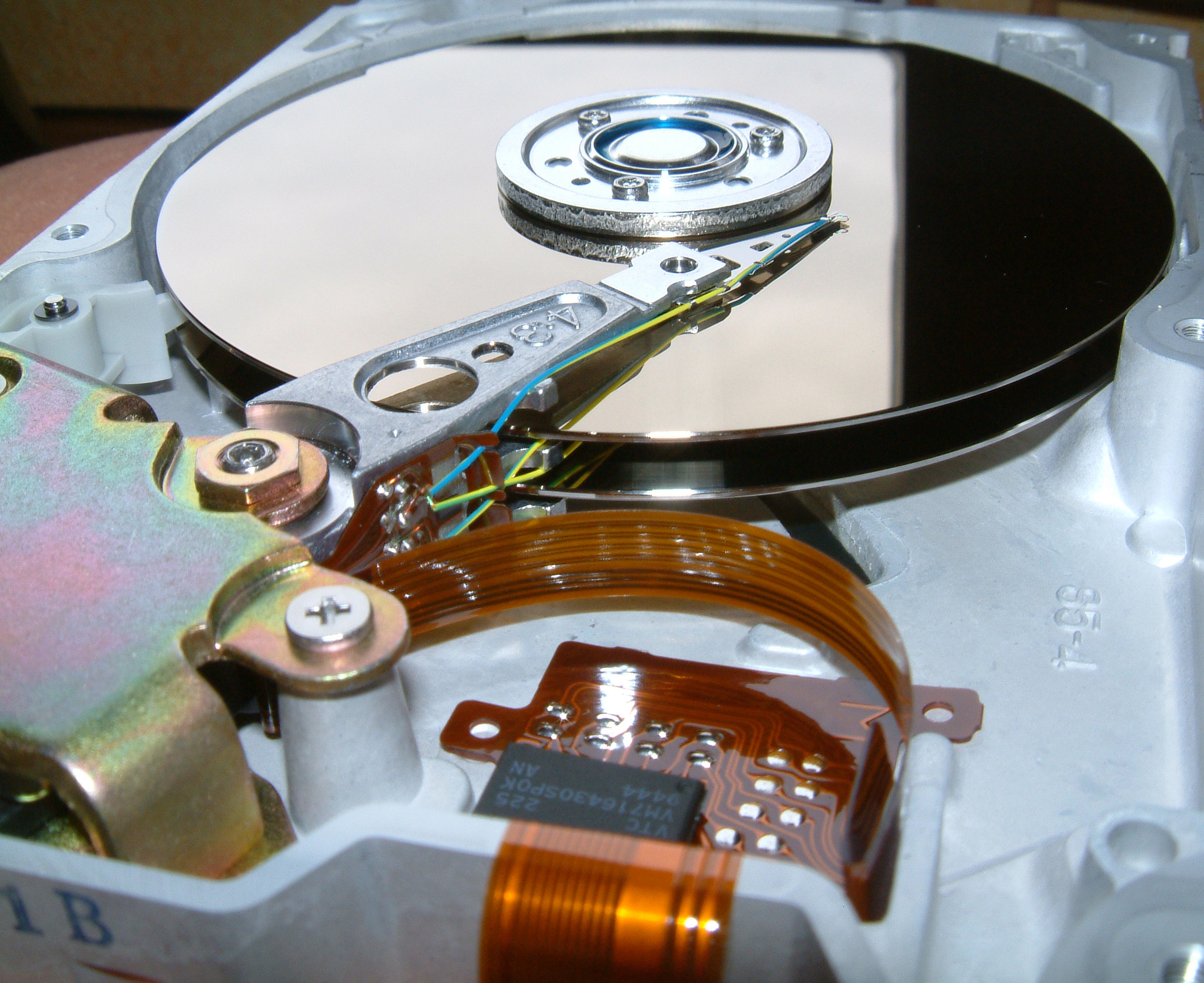
Inside of a disk drive with an actuator arm visible above the uppermost platter

The clicking sound itself arises from the movement of the disk drive's actuator arm that supports the read-and-write heads. At startup, and during use, the disk head must move correctly and be able to confirm that it is correctly tracking data on the disk. If the head fails to move as expected, or upon moving cannot track the disk surface correctly, the disk controller may attempt to recover from the error by returning the head to its home position and then retrying, at times causing an audible "click". In some devices, the retry process may be repeated multiple times, causing a repeated or rhythmic clicking sound, sometimes accompanied by the whirring sound of the spindle motor that rotates the platters.

== Iomega drives ==
Iomega's Zip drives were prone to developing misaligned heads. Iomega received thousands of complaints about the click of death. Iomega stated on their website: "Like the predictable snap of a camera, a 'click' from a Zip drive is normal when a Zip user inserts or ejects a Zip disk, or when a file on a Zip disk is saved or accessed. However, repetitive clicking is a symptom of a damaged drive or disk."

Iomega's Jaz drives were also affected—by early 1999, Iomega stated that the click of death had affected "fewer than half of 1 percent of all Jaz and Zip users". In late 1998, an article in Macworld had discussed Zip drives and "all the horror stories you've read" about the click of death, while noting that "even a statistically tiny number of drive and cartridge failures is enough to spawn a dissatisfied subculture."

A class-action suit (Rinaldi v. Iomega Corp., 41 U.C.C. Rep. Serv. 2d 1143) was filed against Iomega for violation of the Delaware Consumer Fraud Act in September 1999. However, the case was dismissed following a motion from Iomega, based on "a disclaimer that had been included inside the box in which the drive was sold."

== Hard disk drives ==
On a hard disk drive, click of death refers to a similar failure mode; the head actuator may click or knock as the drive repetitively tries to recover from one or more errors. These sounds can be heard as the heads load (park) or unload, or when the actuator is unable to calibrate or locate correctly.
