= Windows Magazine =

- Editor: Fred Davis; Mike Elgan
- Categories: Computing magazine
- Frequency: Monthly
- Total circulation: 800,000 (1999)
- Founder: James E. Fawcette
- First issue: 1990; 36 years ago
- Final issue Number: March 19, 2001; 100
- Company: CMP Media
- Country: United States
- Based in: Manhasset, NY
- Language: English
- Website: informationweek.com/windowslibrary/default.htm archive.org/details/pub_windows-magazine
- ISSN: 1060-1066

Windows Magazine was a monthly magazine for users of the Microsoft Windows operating system. The magazine was based in Manhasset, NY.

== History and profile ==
Windows Magazine was founded in 1990. It was sold to CMP Media in 1991. By 1999, it had a paid circulation of 800,000 and a staff of 45, but its last hardcopy issue was published in August 1999. Before the magazine was shuttered, it created Winmag.com in July 1999. UBM could not monetize a million clicks a month, so the website was shuttered on March 19, 2001. Winmag.com redirects to InformationWeek.com, which does not host any actual winmag.com content.
