= SyQuest Technology =

Defunct American storage equipment manufacturer

- Type: Public
- Traded as: Nasdaq: SYQT
- Industry: Data storage
- Founded: 1982; 44 years ago in Fremont, California, United States
- Founder: Syed Iftikar; Ben Alaimo; Bill Krajewski; Anil Nigam; George Toldi
- Defunct: 2003
- Fate: Partially acquired by Iomega
- Website: syquest.com at the Wayback Machine (archived 1997-07-14)

SyQuest Technology, Inc. was an early entrant into the hard disk drive market for personal computers. Its earliest products were the SQ306R, a 5 MB 3.9" (100 mm) cartridge disk drive and associated Q-Pak cartridge for IBM XT compatibles. Subsequently a non-removable medium version was announced, the SQ306F.

For many years, SyQuest was the most popular means of transferring large desktop publishing documents, such as advertisements, to professional printers. SyQuest marketed its products as able to give personal computer users "endless" hard drive space for data-intensive applications like desktop publishing, Internet information management, pre-press, multimedia, audio, video, digital photography, fast backup, data exchange and archiving, along with confidential data security and easy portability for the road.

The introduction of lower-cost options that offered similar capacity, like the Zip drive and later the CD-R, the latter of which was much less expensive once it reached mass market, seriously eroded SyQuest's sales, and the company went bankrupt in 1998. Sales of its existing inventory continued until 2003.

== History ==
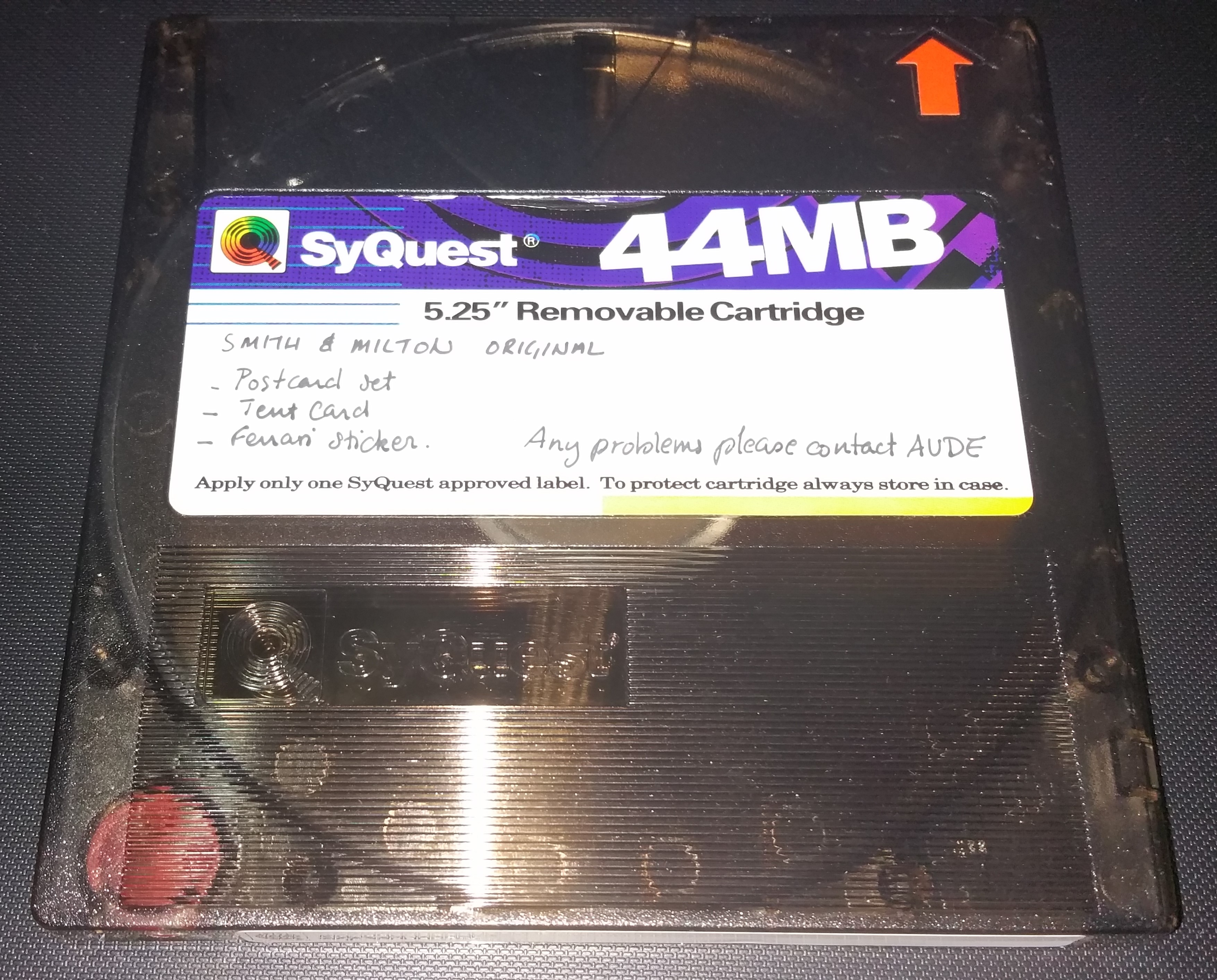
SyQuest 44 MB – 5.25" removable hard disk. Dimensions are 131.38mm × 131.38mm x12.85mm high.

The company was founded on January 27, 1982 by Syed Iftikar who had been a founder of Seagate, along with Ben Alaimo, Bill Krajewski, Anil Nigam and George Toldi.

The company was named partially after the founder, Syed Iftikar, because of a company meeting wherein it was decided that "SyQuest" ought to be a shortened name for "Sy's Quest".

The company announced its first product family of 3.9" (100 mm) cartridge disk drives and associated Q-Pak cartridges at the 1982 National Computer Conference, surprising observers with the low price of $750 for the drive and $35 for a cartridge. They achieved limited success in government markets where removable media were required for security purposes.

In 1986, SyQuest announced the SQ555 and its SQ400 associated cartridge, a 44 MB 5¼-inch removable cartridge hard disk drive, using the industry standard 130 mm disk as its medium. Double capacity versions, the SQ5110 and SQ800 were introduced in 1991. This generation of products became the de facto standard in the Apple Macintosh world to store, transfer, and backup large amounts of data such as generated by graphic artists, musicians, and engineers.

SyQuest went public on the NASDAQ in 1991.

=== Bankruptcy ===
Logo as of 1998

In early 1996, the company cut 60% of its workforce; later that year, company namesake Syed Iftikar was fired "in a management shakeup."

After 1997, SyQuest did not fare well in the market. Their core desktop publishing customers began increasingly to use CD-R media and FTP to transfer files, while Iomega's Zip drives dominated the small office/home office market. Over the period 1995 to 1997, sales declined, resulting in a series of losses. In the first quarter of 1997, those losses had been reduced to $6.8 million with net revenues increasing to $48.3 million. This compares to a net loss of $33.8 million, or $2.98 per share, on net revenues of $78.7 million for the same period the year before.

They company laid off half of its staff in August 1998 before filing for bankruptcy by the end of the year. Portions of the company were purchased by Iomega Corp. in January 1999, with SyQuest retaining the right to sell its remaining inventory on condition of renaming themselves SYQT. Although the company's original syquest.com website continued to provide technical support for its original products until 2003, its rebranded syqt.com website became a digital disk drive and media retailer. By 2009, that website ceased to exist, with its domain (www.syqt.com) put up for sale in the Chinese market.

== Products ==
Syquest's product line included such devices as the following:

Fixed Media Drives (unformatted capacity):

- SQ306F fixed-disk hard drive. 6.38 MB. 5.0 MBit/s. 3 m/s track-to-track. 3,547 rpm. 12,000 bpi. 306 cyl, 2 heads, 1 disc.
- SQ312F fixed-disk hard drive. 12.75 MB.
- SQ325F fixed-disk hard drive. 25.5 MB using MFM encoding. Specs: 612 cylinders, 4 heads, no WPC, no RWC, fastest step rate.
- SQ338F fixed-disk hard drive. 38.2 MB. Supports MFM or RLL encoding. Specs: 615 cylinders, 6 heads, no WPC, no RWC, fastest step rate.

Removable Media Drives (formatted capacity):

- SQ306RD drive/SQ100 disk. 5 MB using MFM encoding.
- SQ312RD drive/SQ200 disk (SyQuest used the SQ200 model number again for a desktop drive in 1994). 10 MB using MFM encoding.
- SQ319RD drive/SQ300 disk. 15 MB using RLL encoding (10 MB using MFM encoding).
- SQ2542 drive/disk – 42 MB 2.5" The Iota series.
- SQ555 drive/SQ400 disk – 44 MB 5.25". Internal SCSI. Also used in the Atari Megafile 44 (Review in Atari Start Magazine March 1990) and sold as part of the E-mu Systems RM45 – Removable Media Storage System.
- SQ5110 drive/SQ800 disk – 88 MB 5.25". Internal SCSI. Compatible with SQ400 disk.
- SQ5200C drive/SQ2000 disk – 200 MB 5.25" internal SCSI. The external desktop version of the SQ5200C was named SQ200, not to be confused with the earlier model SQ200 10 MB disks. Compatible with SQ400 and SQ800 disks.
- SQ3105 drive/SQ310 disk – 105 MB.
- SQ3270 drive/SQ327 disk – 270 MB. Compatible with SQ310 disk.
- EZ135 aka EZDrive 135/EZ135 disk – 135 MB 3.5" removable-disk hard drive. Competitor to Iomega's Zip drive. This was available in SCSI, IDE and parallel port versions.
- EZFlyer aka EZFlyer 230 drive/EZ230 disk – 230 MB 3.5" removable-disk hard drive. EZ135 compatible. Positioned as an upgrade to the EZ135.
- SyJet drive/SQ1500 disk – 1.5 GB removable-disk hard drive. Competitor to Iomega's Jaz drive).
- SparQ drive/SparQ disk – 1.0 GB 3.5" removable-disk hard drive. Lower cost per MB than the SyJet.
- Quest drive/Quest disc – a 4.7 GB removable-disk hard drive. PC Magazine definition. Available for a short time in 1998.

The 5.25" removable-disk hard drives with 44 MB, 88 MB, and 200 MB capacities were mostly used on Macintosh systems via the SCSI interface.

== See also ==
- Avatar Systems, competitor in the removable hard drive market
- Bernoulli Box, a competing storage technology
- Jaz drive, a competing storage technology
