= Jaz drive =

Professional computer backup device

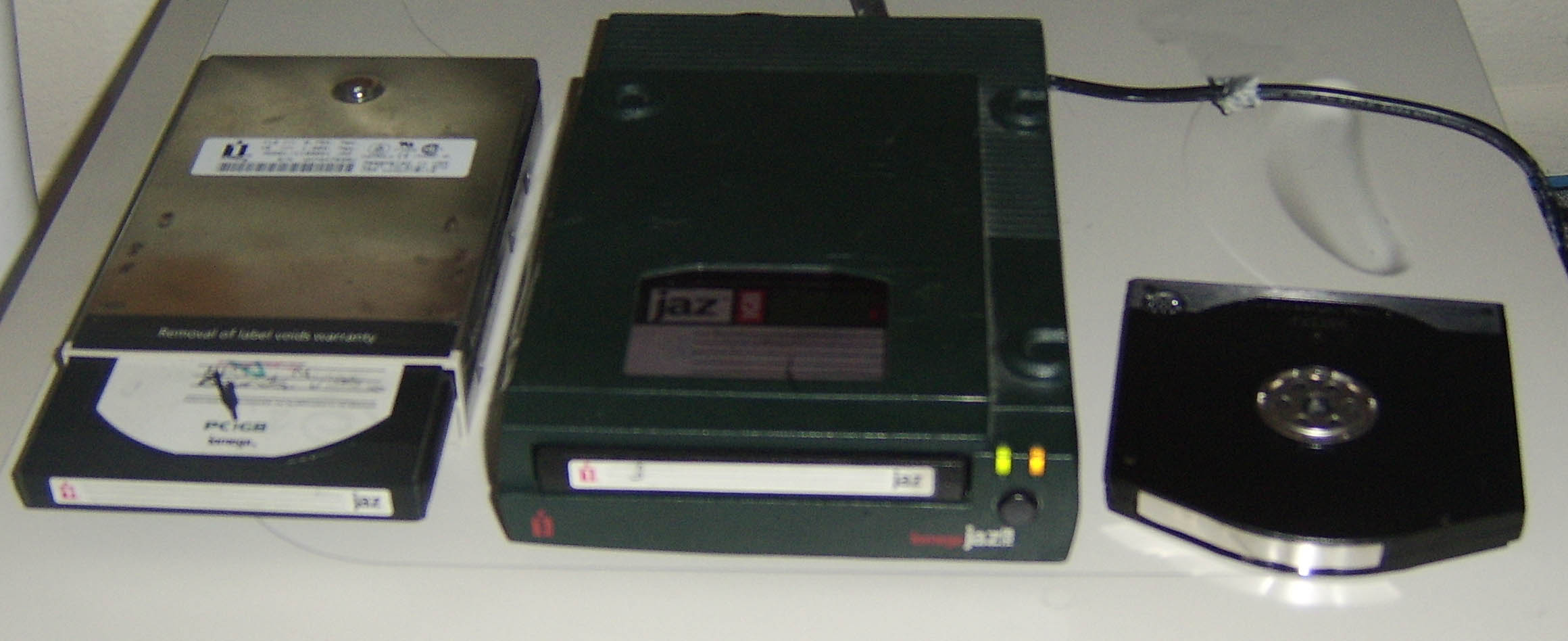
Internal and external 1GB Iomega Jaz drives with media.

The Jaz drive is a removable hard disk storage system sold by the Iomega company from 1996 to 2002.

Following the success of the Iomega Zip drive, which in its original version stores data on high-capacity floppy disks with 100 MB nominal capacity, and later 250 and then 750 MB, the company developed and released the Jaz drive. First shipping to OEMs in December 1995, the Jaz drive featured 1 GB capacity per removable disk. A new Jaz drive model, released in February 1998, increased the individual disk capacity to 2 GB.

The Jaz drive uses a SCSI interface, with both internal and external drive models. Iomega produced a Jaz Jet SCSI adapter PCI card for PCs. Iomega also produced a number of external adapters, including the Jaz Traveller interface that connected it to a standard parallel port, and, later, a SCSI-USB adapter and SCSI-Firewire adapter. An ATA version of the drive was planned but never released.

== Reception ==
The Jaz never attained as much success or market penetration as the Zip drive. While the Zip drive was marketed as a high-capacity floppy disk for the home and small office/home office (SOHO) markets, the Jaz drive was originally advertised as a higher-end product. SCSIs were standard in Apple Macintosh computers but were rare in the much larger market of end-user PCs, usually requiring an extra interface card to be bought and installed. The rising popularity and decreasing price of CD-R/CD-RW drives greatly hurt the success of the Jaz drive, offering a much lower price-per-megabyte and the convenience of the CD media being readable in almost any standard CD-ROM drive.

== Problems ==
Earlier Jaz drives could overheat, and loading-mechanism jams could leave a disk stuck in the drive. This became known in the profession as the "click of death", because of clicking sound it made as it tried and failed to eject the disc. Forcibly ejecting a stuck disk could destroy both the drive and disk. Jaz drives are hard-disk technology, making them susceptible to contaminants in the drive; dust and grit could be introduced through a hole in the disk case where the motor drove the platters, and any dust built up on the external case could enter the drive with its next insertion. Additionally, the metal sliding door was capable of wearing the plastic, resulting in debris and head crashes.

Furthermore, the mechanism used to attach the platters to the spindle motor was complex and tended to vibrate noisily. Iomega implemented an anti-gyro device (much like an optical CD/DVD drive) within the cartridge to prevent vibration at spin-up, but this device lost effectiveness with age. As a result, the two platters could lose alignment, rendering the cartridge unusable. The plastic tabs attached to the bottom of a Jaz cartridge could become stripped or broken, rendering the inserted disk physically incapable of spinning up to operating speed. Some drives also had firmware problems.

== Legacy ==
The later Iomega REV drive tried to use similar technology to address the same market segment that the Jaz drive had reached. The REV's design is derived partly from the IBM 2310's use of a "voice coil actuator (VCA) motor to improve the reliability and reduce the seek time of an HDD's read–write heads" in a removable media cartridge. It also is derived from the IBM 3340's use of "low-cost, low-load, landing read/write heads with lubricated disks". Neither the Jaz drive nor the REV drive copied the IBM 3340 in making the heads a part of the cartridge, although the REV drive moved the motor into the cartridge—which the IBM 3340 had not done. It was left to the RDX Technology drive to move the heads into the cartridge, which increased reliability by essentially making the cartridge an electro-mechanical duplicate of a modern external disk drive.

== Gallery ==
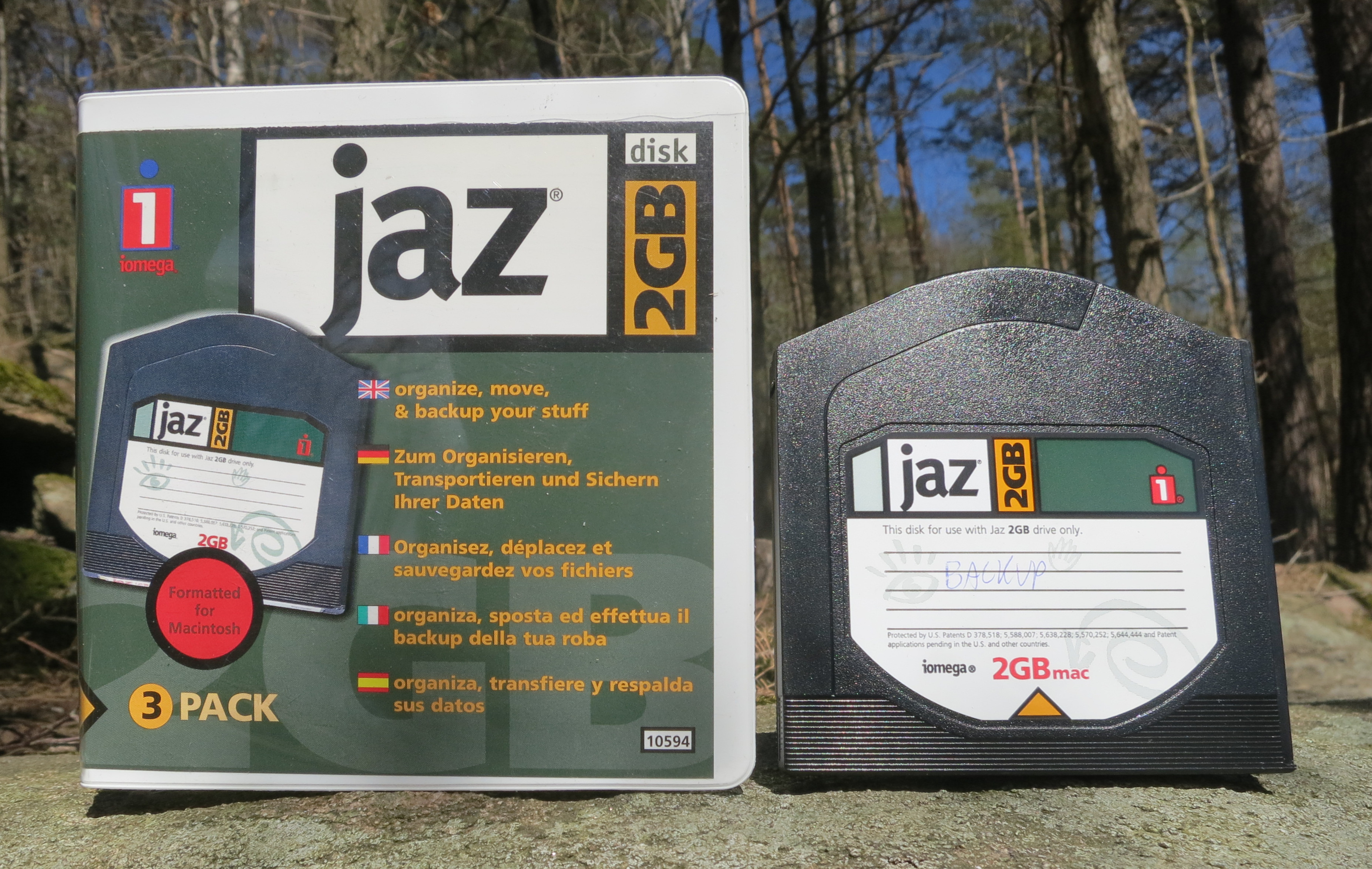
2 GB Jaz disk from the early 2000s

== See also ==
- 64DD, an extension port disk drive add-on for the Nintendo 64
- Bernoulli Box
- Castlewood Orb Drive, a competing drive system
- SyQuest Technology, maker of the competing SyJet and SparQ drive
