= Zip drive =

Removable cartridge disk storage system

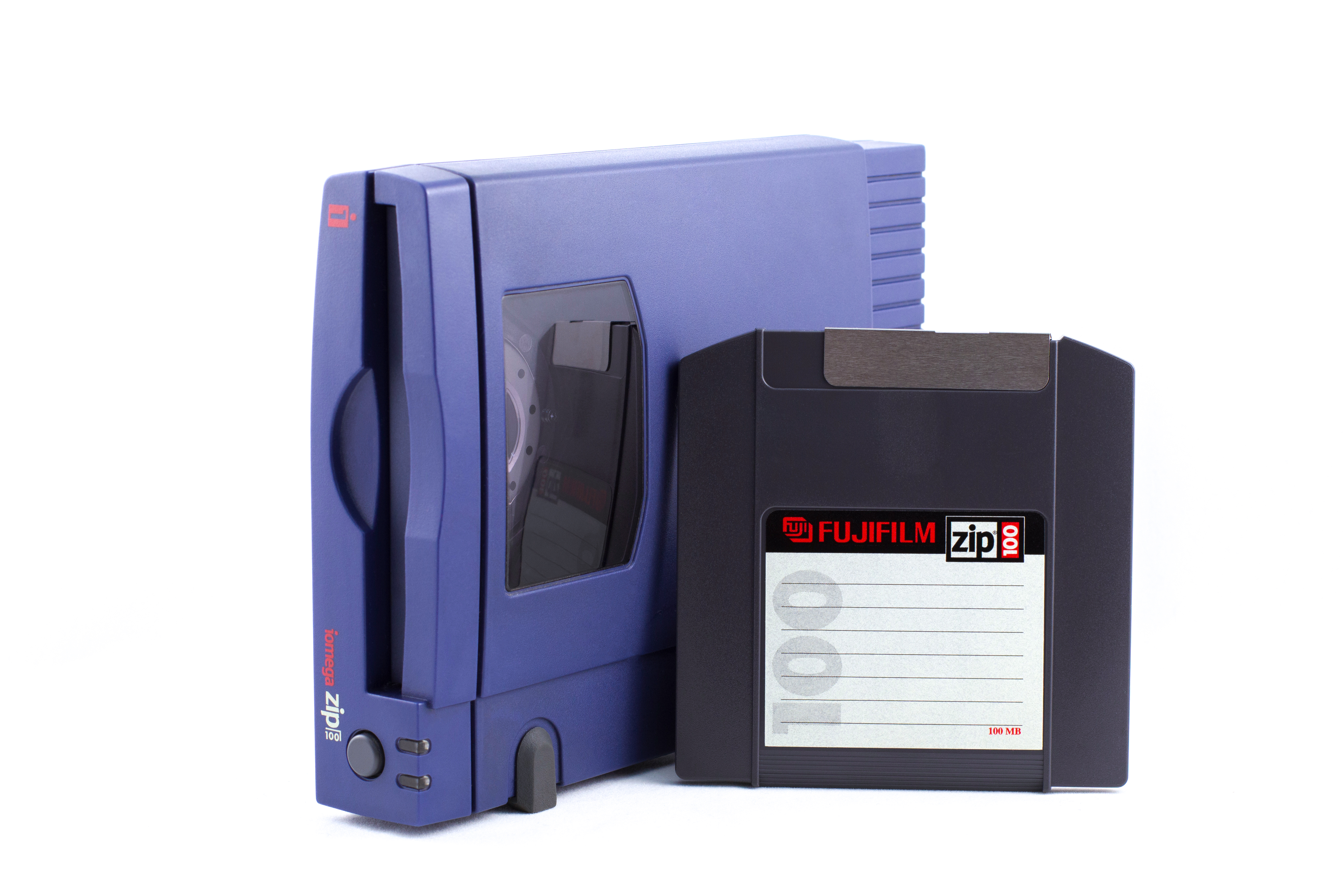
- Zip 100 drive with a disk
- Manufacturer: Iomega
- Type: Magnetic storage
- Introductory price: US$200
- Website: iomega.com/product/zip at the Wayback Machine (archived 1998-06-24)

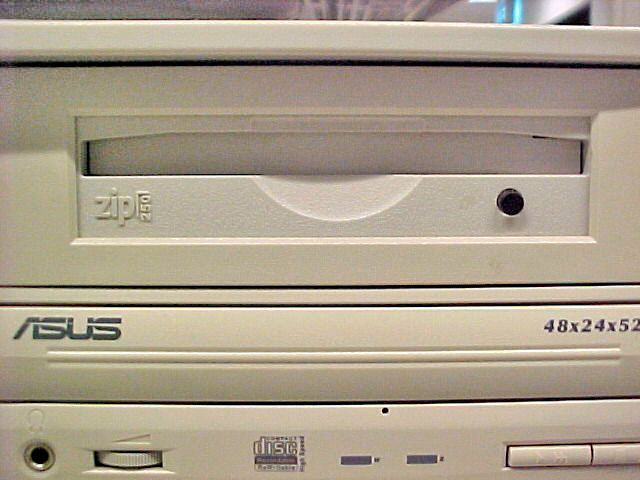
An internal Zip drive installed in a computer

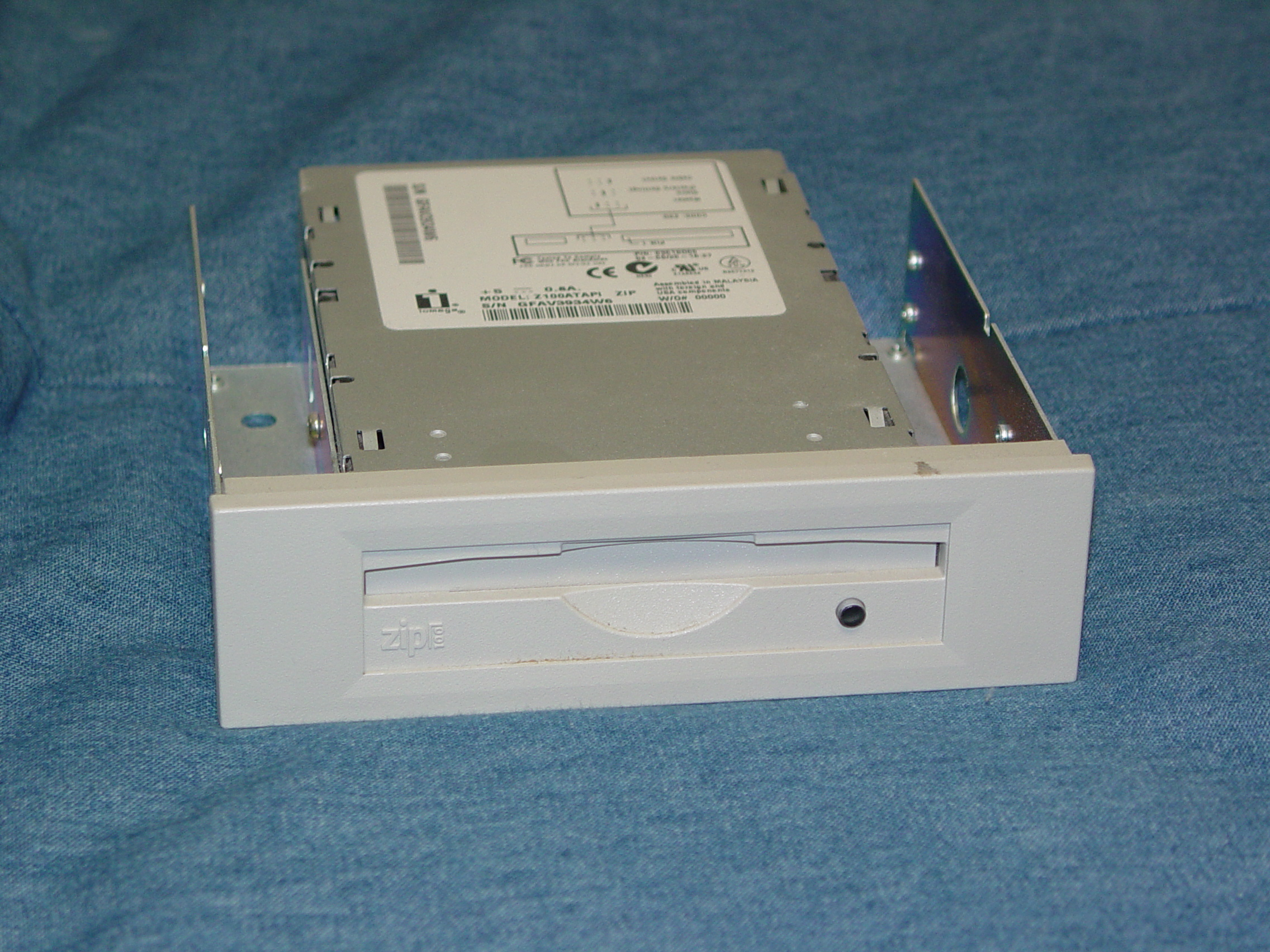
An internal Zip drive outside of a computer but attached to a 3 1/2-inch to 5 1/4-inch drive bay adapter

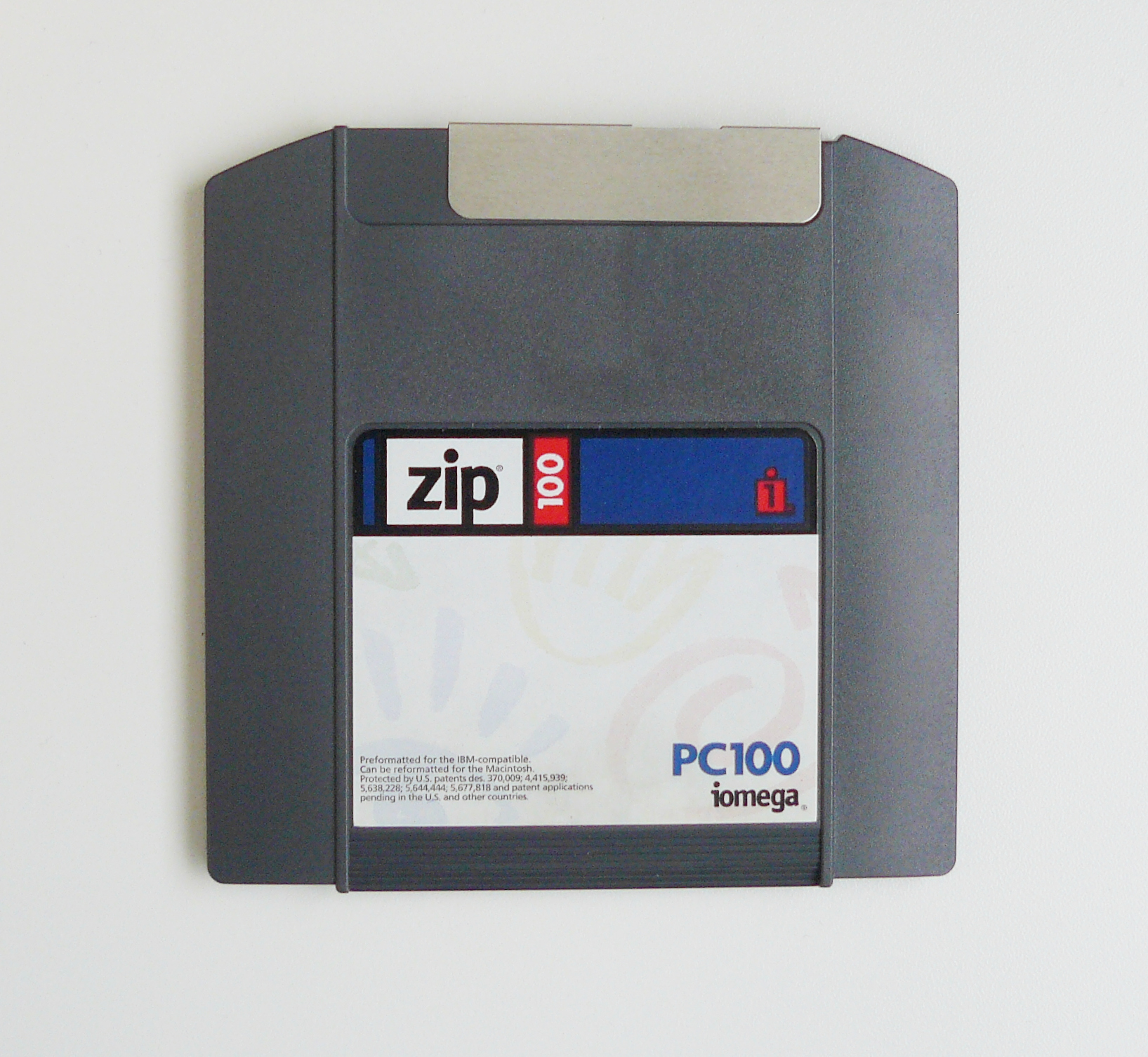
The Zip disk media

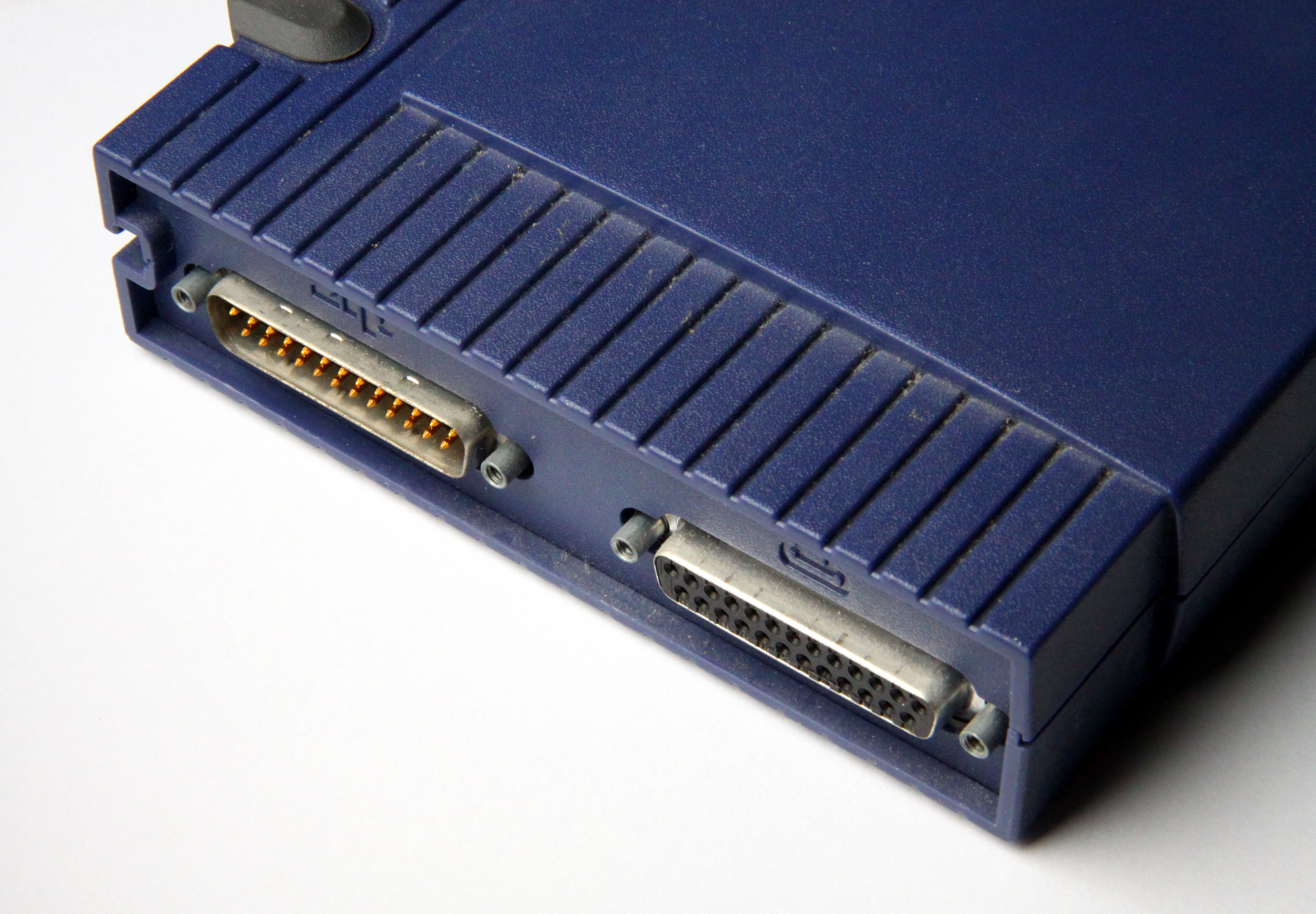
The back of a parallel-port Zip 100 drive with printer pass-through

The Zip drive is a discontinued removable cartridge disk storage system sold by Iomega from 1995 to 2003. Considered medium-to-high-capacity at the time of its release, Zip disks were originally launched with capacities of 100 megabytes (MB), then 250 MB, and finally 750 MB.

The format became the most popular of the superfloppy products, which filled a niche in the late 1990s portable storage market. Nonetheless, it was never popular enough to replace the standard 3 1/2-inch floppy disk. Zip drives fell out of favor for mass portable storage during the early 2000s as CD-RW and USB flash drives became prevalent. The Zip brand later covered internal and external compact disc (CD) writers known as Zip-650 or Zip-CD, despite the dissimilar technology.

== Overview ==
The Zip drive is a "superfloppy" disk drive that has some of the standard 3½-inch floppy disk drive's convenience, but with much greater capacity options and with performance that is much improved over a standard floppy drive. Zip disk housings are similar to but slightly larger than those of standard 3 1/2-inch floppy disks.

In the Zip drive, the heads fly over high density media in a manner similar to a hard disk drive. A linear actuator uses the voice coil actuation technology related to modern hard disk drives.

The original Zip drive has a maximum data transfer rate of about 1.4 megabytes-per-second (MB/s) (comparable to 8× CD-R; although some connection methods are slower, down to approximately 50 kilobytes-per-second (kB/s) for maximum-compatibility parallel "nibble" mode) and a seek time of 28 milliseconds (ms) on average, compared to a standard 1.44 MB floppy's effective ≈16 kB/s and ≈200 ms average seek time. Typical desktop hard disk drives from mid-to-late 1990s revolve at 5,400 revolutions-per-minute (rpm) and have transfer rates from 3 MB/s to 10 MB/s or more, and average seek times from 20 ms to 14 ms or less.

Early generation Zip drives were in direct competition with the SuperDisk (LS-120) drives, which hold 20% more data and can also read standard 3 1/2-inch 1.44 MB diskettes, but they have a lower data-transfer rate due to lower rotational speed.

The Zip drive was Iomega's third generation of products, different from Iomega's earlier Bernoulli Boxes in many ways, including the absence of the Bernoulli plate of the earlier products.

=== Interfaces ===
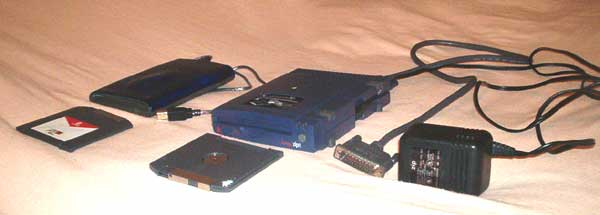
Later (USB, left) and earlier (parallel, right) Zip drives (media in foreground)

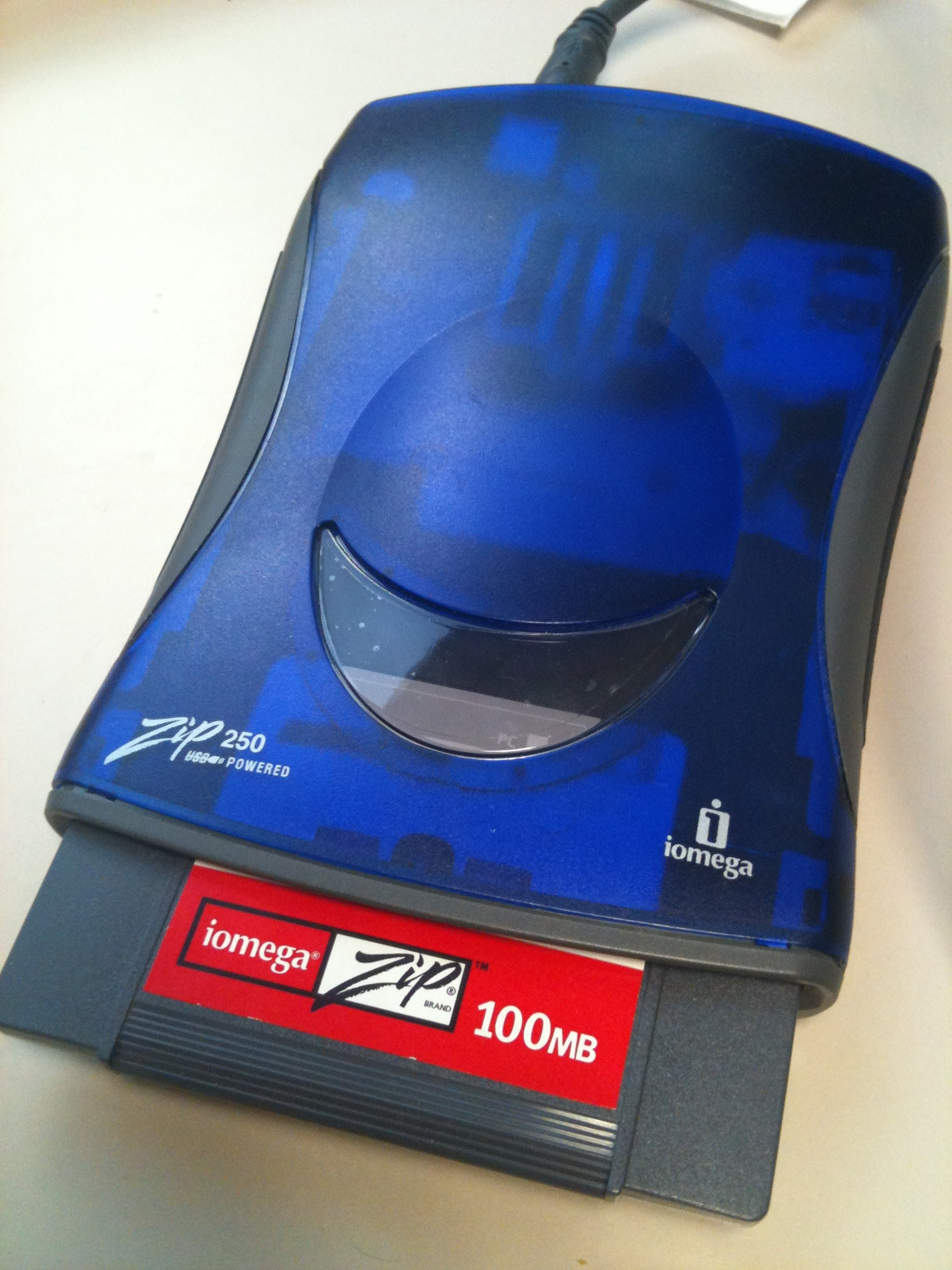
Zip 250 USB drive

Zip drives were produced in multiple interfaces including:

- IDE True ATA (very early ATA internal Zip drives mostly sold to OEMs; these drives exhibit software compatibility issues because they do not support the ATAPI command set)
- ATAPI (all Zip generations)
- USB 1.1 (Zip 100 MB and 250 MB generations)
- USB 2.0 (Zip 750 MB generation; backwards compatible with USB 1.1 systems)
- IEEE 1284 (parallel port) with printer pass through (Zip 100 MB and 250 MB generations) ^{(See NB 3)}
- IEEE 1394 (FireWire) (Zip 250 MB and 750 MB generations)
- SCSI (Zip 100 MB and 250 MB generations; both internal and external editions; external editions limited to ID 5 and 6)
- "Plus" (Zip 100 MB external drive with both SCSI and IEEE 1284 connections; SCSI ID limited to ID 5 and 6).

Parallel port external Zip drives are actually SCSI drives with an integrated Parallel-to-SCSI controller, meaning a true SCSI bus implementation but without the electrical buffering circuits necessary for connecting other external devices. Early Zip 100 drives use an AIC 7110 SCSI controller and later parallel drives (Zip Plus and Zip 250) used what was known as Iomega MatchMaker. The drives are identified by the operating system as "IMG VP0" and "IMG VP1" respectively.

Early external SCSI-based Zip drives were packaged with an included SCSI adapter known as Zip Zoom. The Zip Zoom is a relabeled ISA Adaptec SCSI host controller. Also, originally sold separately was a PCMCIA-to-SCSI adapter for laptop compatibility, also a relabeled Adaptec.

Interface availability
Name	Interface				
Name	ATAPI	SCSI	LPT (Note: Also known as IEEE 1284, parallel port)	USB	FireWire (Note: Also known as IEEE 1394 interface)
Zip 100	Yes	Yes	Yes	Yes	No
Zip 250	Yes	Yes	Yes	Yes	Yes
Zip 750	Yes	No	No	Yes	Yes

Driver support:

- MS-DOS (requires a minimum of a 80286 or processor)
- Windows family (Parallel drives not supported on Windows 7 and above)
- Some Linux / BSD etc. (not universal)
- Oracle Solaris 8, 9, 10, 11
- IBM OS/2
- Macintosh System 6.x,^{(See NB 1)} 7.1–7.5, and Mac OS 7.6–9.2
- macOS
- RISC OS Requires !zip drivers.
- AmigaOS 3.5 or higher
- BeOS from version 3 onwards.
- IRIX 6.4 or higher (SCSI only)

NB 3: Requires a driver older than 5.x.

== Compatibility ==
Zip disks must be used in a drive with an equal or greater storage capacity. Higher-capacity drives can read lower-capacity media. The 250 MB drive writes much more slowly to 100 MB disks than the 100 MB drive, and the Iomega software is unable to perform a "long" (thorough) format on a 100 MB disk (They can be formatted in any version of Windows as normal; the advantage of the Iomega software is that the long format can format the 100 MB disks with a slightly higher capacity. 250 MB disks format to the same size either way). The 750 MB drive can read and write to 250MB disks, but has read-only support for 100 MB disks.

The retroreflective spot differs between the 100 MB disk and the 250 MB such that if the larger disk is inserted in a smaller-capacity drive, the disk is immediately ejected again without any attempt being made to access it. The 750 MB disk has no reflective spot.

== Sales, problems, and licensing ==
Zip drives initially sold well after their shipments began in 1995, owing to their low price and high (for the time) capacity. The drive was initially sold for just under US$200 with one cartridge included, and additional 100 MB cartridges for US$20. At this time hard disks typically had a capacity of 500 MB and cost around US$200, and so backing up with Zip disks was very economical for home users—some computer suppliers such as Dell, Gateway and Apple Inc. included internal Zip drives in their machines. Zip drives also made significant inroads in the graphic arts market, as a cheaper alternative to the Syquest cartridge hard disk system. The price of additional cartridges swiftly dropped further over the next few years, as more companies began supplying them. Eventually, the suppliers included Fujifilm, Verbatim, Toshiba and Maxell, Epson and NEC. NEC also produced a licensed 100 MB drive model with its brand name.

Zip Disk and Drive sales, 1998 to 2003

Sales of Zip drives and disks declined steadily from 1999 to 2003. Zip disks had a relatively high cost per megabyte compared to the falling costs of then-new CD-R and CD-RW discs.

The growth of hard disk drives to multi-gigabyte capacity made backing up with Zip disks less economical. Furthermore, the advent of inexpensive recordable CD and DVD drives for computers, followed by USB flash drives, pushed the Zip drive out of the mainstream market. Nevertheless, during their prime, Zip disks greatly eased the exchange of files that were too big to fit into a standard 3 1/2-inch floppy or an email attachment, and there was no high-speed connection to transfer the file to the recipient. The advantages of magnetic media over optical media and flash memory, in terms of long-term file storage stability and high erase/rewrite cycles, still affords them a niche in the data-storage arena.

In September 1998, a class action suit was filed against Iomega over a type of Zip drive failure dubbed the "Click of Death", accusing Iomega of violation of the Delaware Consumer Fraud Act.

In 2006, PC World rated the Zip drive as the 15th worst technology product of all time. Nonetheless, in 2007, PC World rated the Zip drive as the 23rd best technology product of all time despite its known problems.

== Legacy ==
Zip drives are still used today by retro-computing enthusiasts as a means to transfer large amounts (compared to the retro hardware) of data between modern and older computer systems. The Commodore-Amiga, Atari ST, Apple II, and "old world" Macintosh communities often use drives with the SCSI interface prevalent on those platforms. They have also found a small niche in the music production community, as SCSI-compatible Zip drives can be used with vintage samplers and keyboards of the 1990s.

Zip disks were still in use in aviation until at least 2014. Jeppesen distributed navigation database updates, and Universal Avionics supplies TAWS, UniLink and Performance databases for upload into flight management systems via 100 MB and 250 MB Zip disks.

== ZipCD ==
Iomega also produced a line of internal and external recordable CD drives under the Zip brand in the late 1990s, called the ZipCD 650. It used regular CD-R media and had no format relation to the magnetic Zip drive. The external models were installed in a Zip-drive-style case, and used standard USB 1.1 connections.

Iomega used the DirectCD software from Adaptec to allow UDF drive-letter access to CD-R or CD-RW media.

The company released an open standard CD-R drive and CD-RW media under the same ZipCD name.

Early models of ZipCD drives were relabeled Philips drives, which were also so unreliable that a class action lawsuit succeeded. Later models were sourced from Plextor.

== See also ==
- Caleb UHD
- Castlewood Orb Drive
- EZ 135 Drive
- Jaz drive
- PocketZip
- Sony HiFD
- SuperDisk
- SyQuest
