= Iomega =

Defunct American corporation

Iomega Corporation
- Industry: Computer
- Founded: April 1, 1980 in Roy, Utah, U.S. (as an IBM spin-off)
- Founder: David Bailey and David Norton
- Defunct: 2008; 18 years ago
- Fate: Acquired by EMC Corporation and Lenovo
- Headquarters: San Diego, California, U.S.
- Products: Computer storage
- Owners: Lenovo; Dell EMC
- Number of employees: 450 (in 2005)
- Website: iomega.com at the Wayback Machine (archived 2007-07-11)

Iomega Corporation (later LenovoEMC) was a company that produced external, portable, and networked data storage products. Established in the 1980s in Roy, Utah, United States, Iomega sold more than 410 million digital storage drives and disks, including the Zip drive floppy disk system. Formerly a public company, it was acquired by EMC Corporation in 2008, and then by Lenovo, which rebranded the product line as LenovoEMC, until discontinuation in 2018.

== History ==
Iomega started in Roy, Utah, U.S. in 1980, with the original founders Jerome Paul Johnson, David Bailey, and David Norton. Its headquarters were moved to San Diego, California in 2001. For many years, it was a significant name in the data storage industry. Iomega's most famous product, the Zip drive, offered relatively large amounts of storage on portable, high-capacity floppy disks. The original Zip disk's 100 MB capacity was a huge improvement over the decades-long standard of 1.44 MB standard floppy disks. The Zip drive became a common internal and external peripheral for IBM-compatible and Macintosh personal computers. However, Zip drives sometimes failed after a short period, which failure was commonly referred to as the "click of death." This problem, combined with competition from CD-RW drives, caused Zip drive sales to decline dramatically, even after introducing larger 250 MB and 750 MB versions. Iomega eventually launched a CD-RW drive.

Without the revenue from its proprietary storage disks and drives, Iomega's sales and profits declined considerably. Iomega's stock price, which was over $100 at its height in the 1990s, fell to around $2 in the mid-2000s. Trying to find a niche, Iomega released devices such as the HipZip MP3 player, the FotoShow Digital Image Center, and numerous external hard drives, optical drives, and NAS products. None of these products were successful.

In 2012, reporter Vincent Verweij of Dutch broadcaster KRO revealed that at least 16,000 Iomega NAS devices were publicly exposing their users' files on the Internet. This was due to Iomega having disabled password security by default. KLM, ING Group, and Ballast Nedam all had confidential material leaked in this manner. Iomega USA acknowledged the problem and said future models (starting February 2013) would have password security enabled by default. The company said it would clearly instruct users about the risks of unsecured data.

=== Acquisition by EMC ===
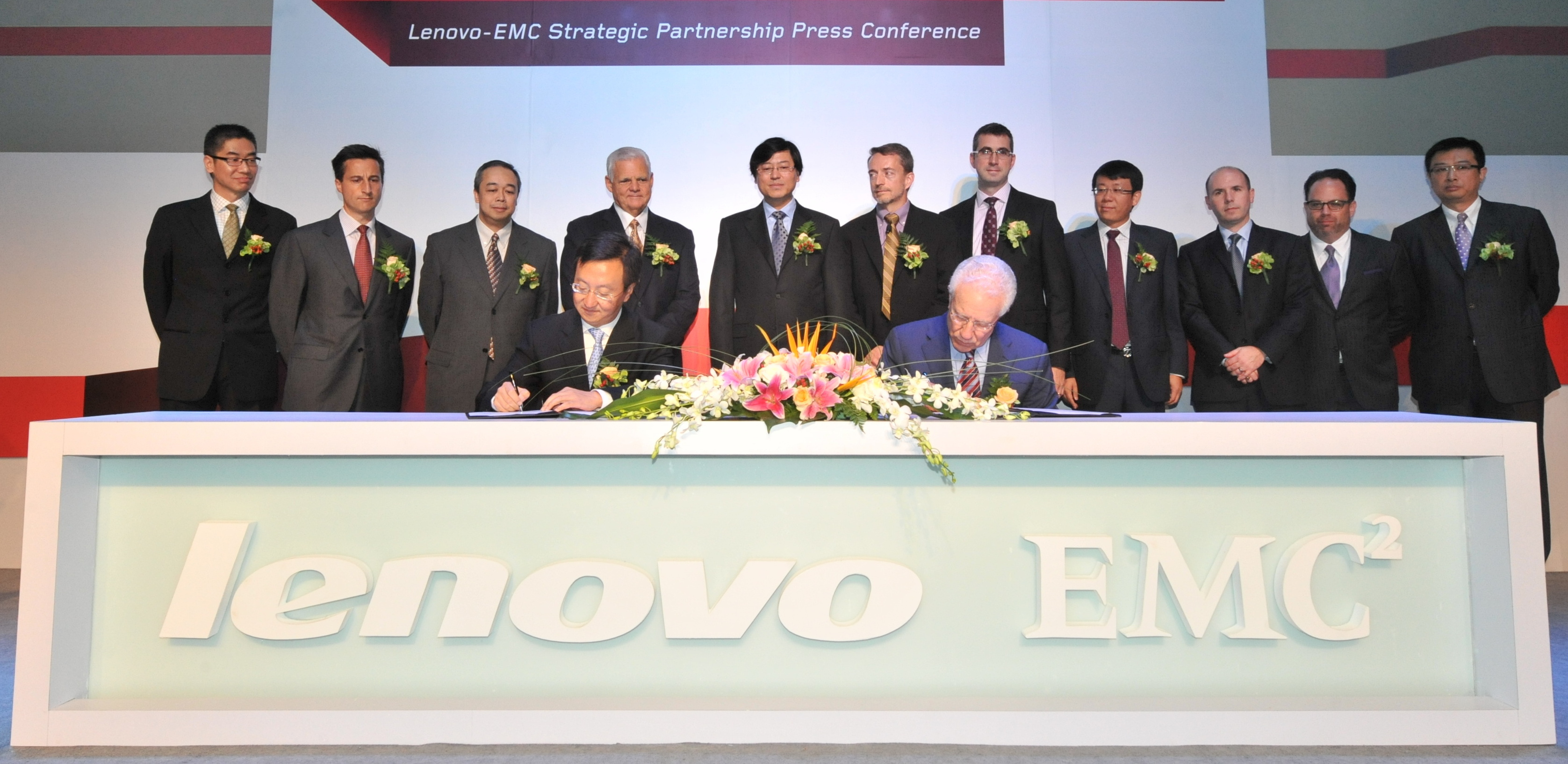
The signing ceremony that created LenovoEMC joint venture

On April 8, 2008, EMC Corporation announced plans to acquire Iomega for US$213 million. The acquisition was completed in June 2008, making Iomega the SOHO/SMB arm of EMC. EMC kept the Iomega brand name alive with products such as the StorCenter NAS line, ScreenPlay TV Link adapter, and v.Clone virtualization software (a Iomega-branded version of VMware's Player virtualization-solution).

=== Joint venture with Lenovo: LenovoEMC ===
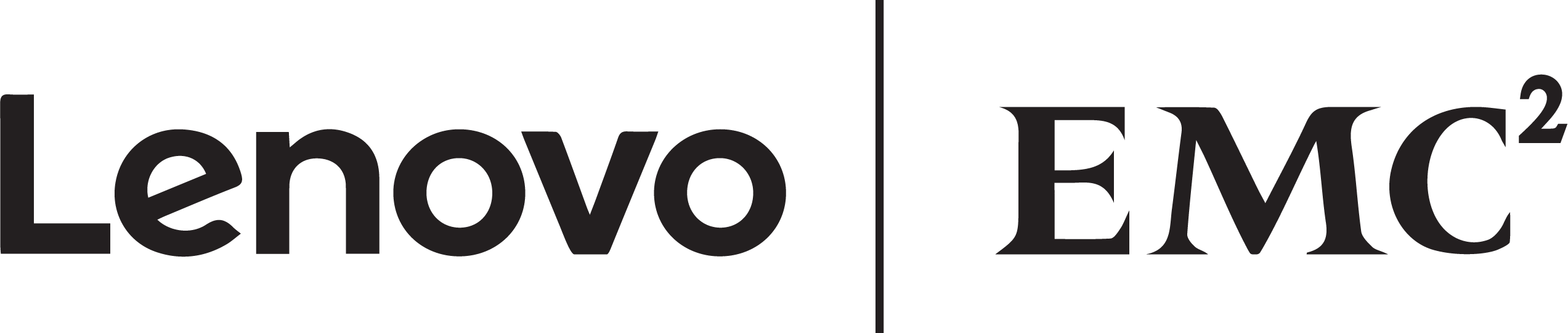
The LenovoEMC logo

In 2013, EMC (before the Dell purchase) formed a joint venture with Chinese technology company Lenovo, named LenovoEMC, that took over Iomega's business. LenovoEMC rebranded all of Iomega's products under its name. LenovoEMC designed products for small and medium-sized businesses that could not afford enterprise-class data storage. LenovoEMC was a part of a broader partnership between the two companies announced in August 2012. The partnership also included an effort to develop x86-based servers and allowing Lenovo to act as an OEM for some EMC hardware. LenovoEMC was a part of Lenovo's Enterprise Products Group before it ultimately dissolved with the EMC Dell acquisition.

In November 2013, Lenovo announced the construction of a research and development facility near São Paulo, Brazil. This facility was dedicated to enterprise software and supporting LenovoEMC's development of high-end servers and cloud storage. Construction would cost $100 million and about 100 people would be employed at the facility. It would be located in the University of Campinas Science and Technology Park, about 60 miles from São Paulo. Later in 2016 the Brazil facility was downscaled and relocated elsewhere.

=== 1980–1999 ===
- 1980: April 1, Iomega Founded
- 1982: Released First Bernoulli Box Drive (10 MB)
- 1985: Released Bernoulli Box Drive for the Macintosh platform (5 MB)
- 1987: September, Shipped first Bernoulli Box II model (20 MB)
- 1988: Released Bernoulli Box 44 MB drive
- 1991: July, Shipped Bernoulli Box 90 MB drive
- 1992: October, Shipped Bernoulli MultiDisk 150 drive.
- 1994: October, Shipped Bernoulli 230 drive.
- 1995: January, Shipped Iomega Ditto Tape Drive
- 1995: March, Released Zip 100 MB Drive
- 1995: December, Shipped Jaz Drive 1 GB Drive
- 1997: June, Announced Buz Multimedia Producer
- 1997: November, Unveiled Clik! 40 MB Drive
- 1998: February, Shipped Jaz 2 GB Drive
- 1998: December, Shipped Zip 250 MB Drive
- 1999: Shipped First Internal CD-RW Drive

==== Bernoulli Optical Systems Corporation ====
To leverage its existing Bernoulli technology, Iomega had established a dedicated subsidiary, Bernoulli Optical Systems Corporation (BOSCO), to collaborate with Imperial Chemical Industries on applications of a flexible optical storage medium made of polyester and coated with organic dyes and polymers. The medium, suitable for use in disc and tape products, had write once read many characteristics, and was modified and read using a laser. BOSCO had been developing a 5 1/4 inch floppy disk drive that would leverage the "lightweight fixed-focus technology" for a smaller drive size, with disks offering up to 1.5 GB of capacity. Creo Products had also announced a tape-based storage solution, the Creo Optical Tape Recorder, employing the media, which was being marketed under the Digital Paper name. Availability of the tape drive was scheduled for October 1989.

=== 2000–present ===
- 2000: September, Launched HipZip Digital Audio Player
- 2000: October, Shipped FotoShow Digital Image Center
- 2000: December, Shipped First External CD-RW Drive
- 2001: January, Announced Peerless Drive System
- 2001: March, Shipped DataSafe Network Attached Storage (NAS) Server
- 2001: July, eliminating .. one-third of its work force, planning to move from Utah to California.
- 2002: April, Announced Portable and External Hard Drive Family
- 2002: August, Shipped Zip 750MB Drive
- 2002: November, Launched USB Mini Flash Drive
- 2003: March, Launched iStorage Online Storage
- 2003: March, Announced External Standard Floppy Drive
- 2003: June, Announced first DVD-RW drive, shipped 50 millionth Zip drive
- 2003: November, Introduced Super DVD QuikTouch
- 2004: February, Shipped CD-RW/DVD-ROM 7-in-1 Card Reader
- 2004: April, Shipped REV 35GB Drive, shipped Floppy Plus 7-in-1 Card Reader
- 2004: September, Introduced Wireless NAS Server
- 2004: October, Introduced REV Autoloader 1000
- 2005: November, Announced ScreenPlay Multimedia Drive
- 2006: September, Introduced desktop RAID storage
- 2008: January, Announced eGo Portable Hard Drive
- 2008: April, EMC acquired Iomega
- 2008: April, Announced ScreenPlay HD Multimedia Drive
- 2008: May, Announced eGo Desktop Hard Drive
- 2008: August, Introduced ScreenPlay TV Link Multimedia Adapter
- 2008: September, Announced the new eGo Helium Portable Hard Drive
- 2008: October, Announced StorCenter ix2, announced ScreenPlay Pro HD Multimedia Drive
- 2009: January, Shipped Iomega Home Media Network Hard Drive
- 2009: February, Announced StorCenter ix4-100 Server
- 2009: April, Ships the StorCenter ix4-200r NAS
- 2009: May, New Generation of eGo Portable Hard Drives
- 2009: August, Announced StorCenter ix4-200d NAS
- 2009: October, Announced StorCenter ix2-200
- 2010: January, Shipped Iomega iConnect Wireless Data Station
- 2010: January, Announced ScreenPlay Media Player, Director Edition; announced v.Clone Technology: Take your PC Virtually Anywhere
- 2010: April, Iomega celebrates 30 years
- 2010: May, Announced StorCenter ix12-300r NAS
- 2010: June, Introduced Skin Hard Drive by Iomega
- 2011: March, introduced Cloud Edition IX series
- 2013: January, Iomega Corporation was renamed to LenovoEMC Limited, which is a joint venture between Lenovo Group Limited and EMC Corporation. Lenovo owns the majority stake in the new company.

== Products ==
Iomega designed and manufactured a range of products intended to compete with and ultimately replace the 3.5" floppy disk, notably the Zip drive. Initial Iomega products connected to a computer via SCSI or parallel port; later models used USB and FireWire (1994).

=== PX4-400d ===
The 400d was a multi-bay network-attached storage (NAS) device. The 400d was powered by an Intel Atom processor running at 2.13 gigahertz, had 2 gigabytes of RAM, and a SATA 3 controller capable of moving data at 6 gigabits per second. The HDMI-out function enabled monitoring live feeds from surveillance cameras. The unit can be set up and managed without a PC using an external display, keyboard, and mouse. The 400d is LenovoEMC's first product sold with its LifeLine 4.1 software, which added functions such as a domain mode, enhanced Active Directory support and a more robust SDK. McAfee ePolicy Orchestrator was included for centralized security management. All THINK-branded systems from Lenovo pre-installed with Windows 8.1 included LenovoEMC Storage Connector in order make discovery and set-up of the 400d and other LenovoEMC NAS devices smoother.

=== Lenovo Beacon Home Cloud Centre ===
At the 2014 International CES, LenovoEMC announced the Lenovo Beacon Home Cloud Centre. The Beacon is a storage device that allows remote sharing of data such as music, pictures, and video. The Beacon allows music and video streaming to multiple devices. Android phones and tablets can be used to control the Beacon. It also has an HDMI port to allow connection to a television or monitor. Up to 6 terabytes of storage, RAID 0 and 1, Wi-Fi, and Bluetooth are all supported.

== See also ==
- Nomaï, a competitor that was acquired and closed down
- SyQuest Technology
