= Yamaha SY99 =

Synthesizer

SY99
- Manufacturer: Yamaha
- Dates: 1991

Technical specifications
- Polyphony: 32-voice
- Timbrality: 16-part
- Oscillator: 6-Operator FM, PCM (AWM2)
- Synthesis type: FM, subtractive
- Filter: HPF, LPF
- Aftertouch expression: Yes
- Velocity expression: Yes
- Storage memory: 128 preset patches, 128 user patches, 16 user multi-patches
- Effects: 2 × 63 types

Input/output
- Keyboard: 76 key
- Left-hand control: Pitch wheel, 2 × modulation wheel
- External control: MIDI (In, Out, Thru)

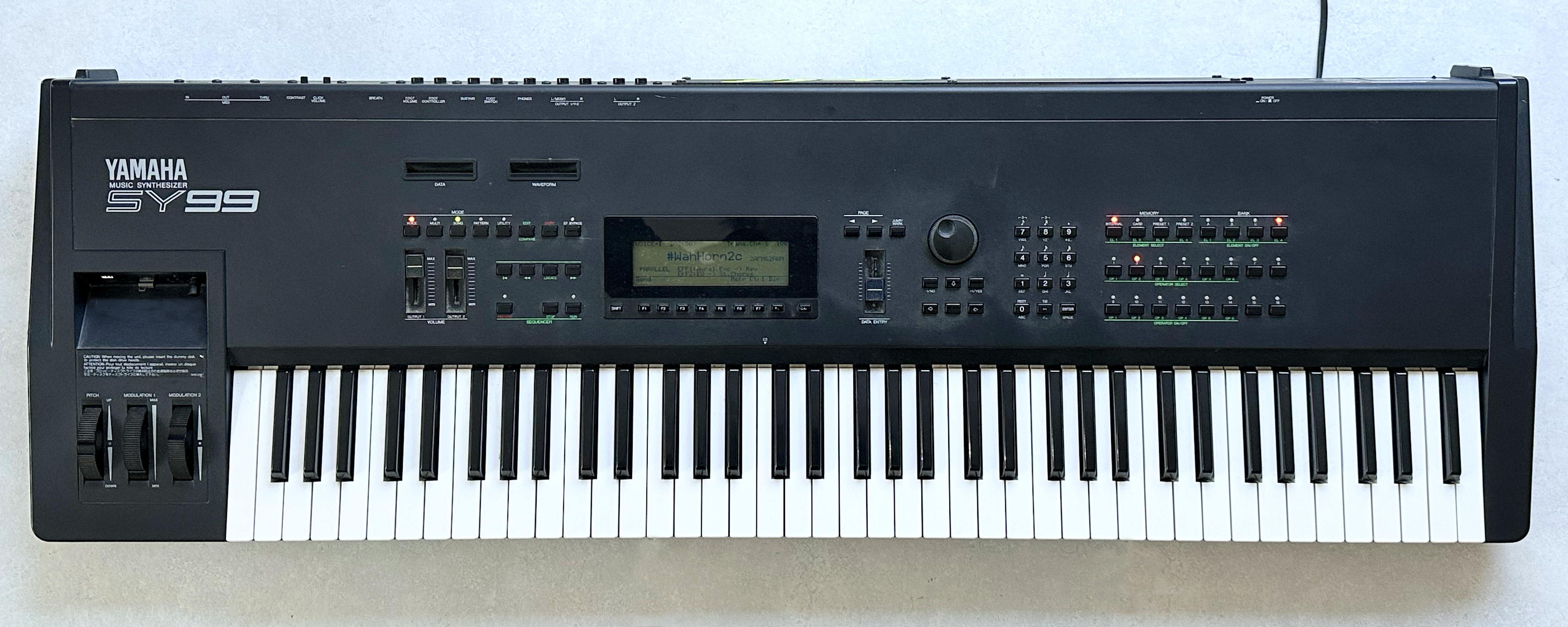
Yamaha SY99 Synthesizer

The Yamaha SY99 is a digital synthesizer combining frequency modulation synthesis (branded as Advanced FM) and sample-based synthesis (branded as Advanced Wave Memory 2), a substractive synthesis based on either basic sine, square, triangle or saw oscillators (digital modelling of earlier analog synthesizers), or complex waveforms (PCM). Complex PCM samples could be used as modulators in the FM sound generation, which could also be controlled in many different ways (by velocity, aftertouch, 2 control wheels, control pedal and breath controller) simultaneously, allowing the creation of very complex and “lively” sounds and very expressive modulation. It is the direct successor to Yamaha's SY77/TG77. Compared to the SY77, it has a larger keyboard at 76 keys instead of 61, a larger ROM with more in-built PCM samples, the ability to load user-specified PCM samples into on-board RAM, which also can be fed into FM synthesis, an upgraded effects processor (based upon the Yamaha SPX900 rather than the SPX50 or SPX90), many parameters of which could be controlled in realtime by the various control sources, and several other enhanced features.

== Specifications ==
- Date produced: 1991
- Polyphony: 16 notes ("Elements") of AFM + 16 notes (Elements") of sample-playback (AWM2)
- Voice Architecture: Each voice can have up to 2 AFM (6-operator) Elements polyphonically, or 4 AFM (6-op) Elements monophonically, plus up to 2 AWM Elements
- Filter: 2 multi-stage, time-variant, with resonance and self-oscillation per Element
- Sequencer: 16 tracks, ~27,000 note capacity, 99 patterns, up to 10 songs (cf. the SY77's single song only and ~16,000 notes)
- Effects: 2 internal digital effects processors with 63 types of effects, derived from Yamaha's popular rack-mounted processor, SPX900
- Keyboard: 76 notes with velocity and channel aftertouch, which can be zoned along with pitch-bend to affect only specific keys (unlike on the SY77)
- Memory: 128 preset patches and 128 user patches, 16 preset multi-patch setups (up to 16 voices each) and 16 user multi-patches, 512kB of RAM as standard for user-loaded AWM samples or MIDI data recording from/to connected devices
- Expandability: Disk drive for 720kB DSDD 3½-inch floppy disks which allowed to save/upload various file types (All data, voices, samples, songs, multis etc.). SY99 still in use today typically have this floppy drive exchanged by a Floppy disk hardware emulator allowing the use of USB sticks; 2 card slots for cartridges (one for programs, one for samples); 5 rear-mounted slots for SYEMB05 memory modules of 512kB each, up to a total of 3MB RAM with standard hardware. The final firmware revision, v1.57, supports up to 8MB of total RAM, a capacity that so far has only been reached by Musitronics' now-discontinued 5 MB upgrade board coupled with the full complement of 5 SYEMB05 modules (2.5MB) and standard RAM (0.5MB). The internal RAM of the SY99 is powered by two CR2032 batteries, which are soldered to the two main boards and have to be replaced every 10-15 years.
- Control: MIDI in, out, and thru; pitch wheel; 2 modulation wheels; modulation pedal; breath controller input; enhanced functions as a master keyboard when compared to the SY77, etc.

== Demo song ==
"99 flavors", an instrumental song by Chick Corea from his Beneath the Mask album, is named after the SY99; the sequenced version was included on an accompanying floppy disk as a factory demo song, featured a voice intro spoken by Chick Corea himself. Other factory demo disks contained other samples of human voices, including Gregorian chants, funky spoken elements and female vocalists.

== Notable users ==
- Brian Eno
- Chick Corea
- Front 242
- Jean Ven Robert Hal
- Patrice Rushen
- David Paich
- Vangelis
- Pochonbo Electronic Ensemble
- Masato Nakamura
