= Fdformat =

Fdformat is the name of two unrelated programs, both performing "low-level format" of floppy disks.

== DOS tool ==
FDFORMAT is written by Christoph H. Hochstätter in Pascal. It allows users to format a floppy to a higher than usual density, enabling the user to store up to 300 kilobytes more data on a normal high density 3.5" floppy disk. It also increases the speed of diskette I/O on these specially formatted disks using a technique called "Sector Sliding". In this technique, the physical sectors on the disk are ordered in such a way that when the drive advances to the next track, the next logical sector waiting to be read is immediately available to the read head.

== Linux tool ==
The Linux fdformat program works with the kernel floppy driver. It simply formats a floppy disk using whatever parameters is already known to the system. The setfdprm can be used to provide the system with unusual formatting parameters with which to format.

Functionality similar to Hochstätter's FDFORMAT is provided by fdutils, written by Alain Knaff.

== See also ==
- DMF, a high-density diskette format used by Microsoft
- VGA-Copy, a similar program that allowed higher floppy disk capacity
- XDF, a high-density diskette format used by IBM
