= Yamaha SY77 =

1989 synthesizer

SY77
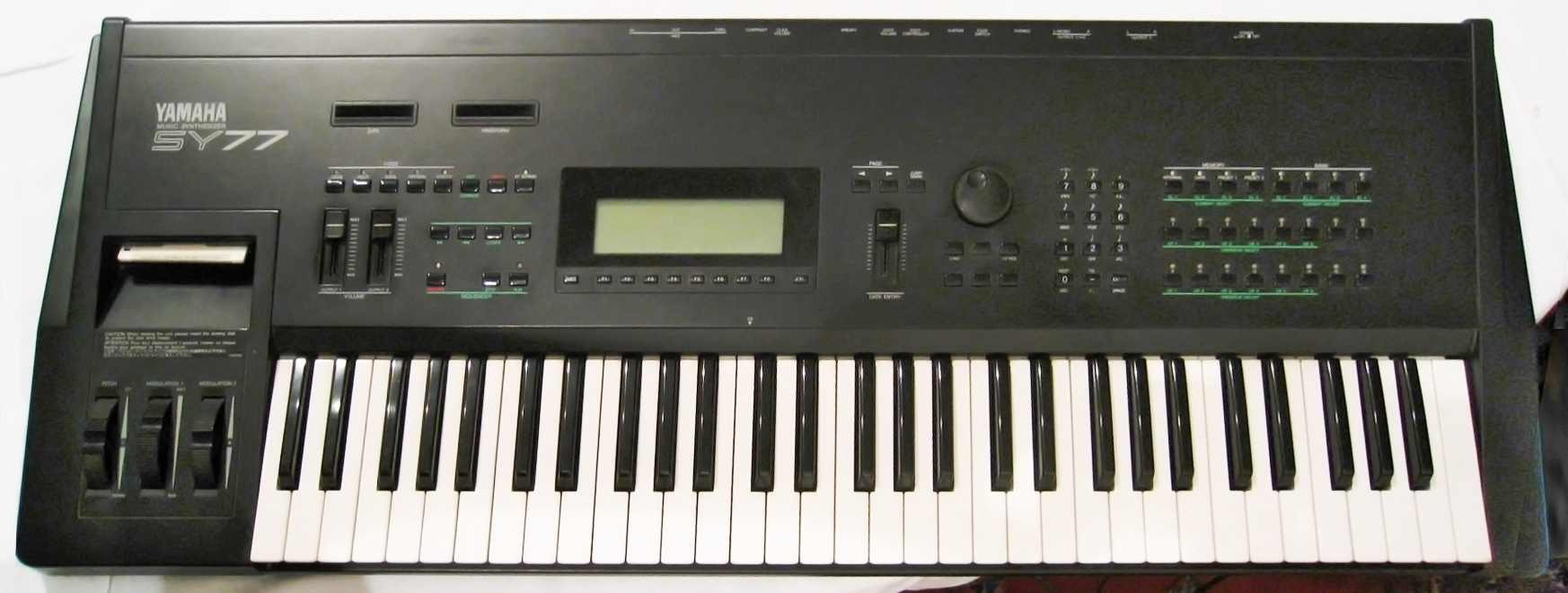
- Manufacturer: Yamaha
- Dates: (Japan) December 1, 1989
- Price: (Japan) ¥300,000

Technical specifications
- Polyphony: 32 (16 AFM layers, 16 AWM layers), shared between up to 16 voices
- Timbrality: 16 voices, each containing up to 2 AFM layers and 2 AWM layers
- Oscillator: sine wave and 15 harmonically enhanced variants thereof
- LFO: sine, sawtooths, triangle, sample-and-hold; can control pitch, amplitude, cutoff, etc.
- Synthesis type: Digital Frequency modulation, Digital Sample-based
- Filter: lowpass (12 dB or 24 dB), highpass, or multi-pole
- Storage memory: 64 custom patches can be stored in battery-powered onboard RAM
- Effects: 2 reverb units (40 effect types) and 2 modulation units (4 effect types)

Input/output
- Keyboard: 61 keys with velocity sensitivity and aftertouch
- Left-hand control: Pitch-bend, 2 modulation wheel
- External control: MIDI

Yamaha SY77 is a 16 voice multitimbral music workstation first produced by Yamaha Corporation in 1989. The SY77 is a synthesizer whose architecture combines AFM (Advanced Frequency Modulation) synthesis, AWM2 (Advanced Wave Memory 2) for ROM-borne sample-based synthesis, and the combination of these two methods christened Realtime Convolution and Modulation Synthesis (RCM). The same technology was also packaged in a rack-mounted module released simultaneously, the TG77.

The SY77 is equipped with a 61-key keyboard with velocity and aftertouch; has a pitch wheel and two modulation wheels (the latter being quite a rare feature among keyboards in general); and has a large backlit LCD, expansion slots, floppy-drive, on-board effects, and a 16,000 note sequencer. Programming is performed through a keypad on the front panel.

When the SY77 was released in late 1989, its initial prices were close to $3000 USD/£2000 GBP. In 1991, it was followed by the SY99, a successor that cost ~$4000/£3000 and expanded its capabilities with a 76-key keyboard, the ability to load user-specified samples for AWM, a more advanced effects unit, and other features.

== Synthesis technologies ==
The AFM synthesis of the SY77 is effectively a superset of the 6-operator FM synthesis available on the Yamaha DX7 and DX7 II series of synthesizers. It is capable of all of the sounds that can be produced by those earlier keyboards – with various programs being able to automatically translate DX patches intelligently into accurate SY equivalents – and many more sounds besides. Among the advantages of AFM synthesis over the DX7's implementation of FM synthesis are: 15 additional waves besides the standard sine, which have additional harmonic content; 45 standard algorithms instead of the DX7's 32, plus a new ability to design one's own custom-routed algorithm using MIDI/SysEx; the flexible routing of up to three feedback sources within any algorithm, as opposed to the DX series' fixed algorithms with a single source each; the ability to route the FM signal through a configurable filter with the options of resonance and self-oscillation; and more.

The SY/TG series also features Yamaha's now-flagship Advanced Wave Memory 2 (AWM2) technology for playback and manipulation of PCM samples, an evolution of the AWM included earlier in their TX16W. Such waveforms can be used as samples alone; can be layered with FM-based Elements, including using them as transients to FM-synthesized main waveforms, similarly to Roland's LA synthesis; or, in a feature unique to the SY/TG series, can be used as modulators for FM operators in place of elementary signals like the sine wave.

These technologies, both alone and in combination (the latter giving rise to the name Realtime Convolution and Modulation), can generate rich, layered, multi-timbral sounds, and there are large libraries of patches available for the SY77. Sound sets on floppy disks are available online with patches and presets ranging from emulations of classic synthesizers and ambient pads, to percussion and organ sounds. A single 720 KB (DD) formatted floppy disk can hold over 400 patches. The TG77 lacks the disk drive but can still load patches and settings via MIDI SysEx. However, software applications exist that can convert previously disk-only and thus SY77-only files into a TG77-compatible format.

== Legacy ==
The SY/TG range as a whole was discontinued sometime between 1995 and 1997. In 1994 the SY77 and SY99 were replaced as the flagship Yamaha synthesizer workstations by the W7 and W5, respectively. However, the SY77 and SY99 were the last Yamaha "flagship" workstations to be natively capable of the fully fledged FM synthesis that had been introduced with the DX line. Yamaha's later FS1r was the most advanced of their FM synthesizers, adding 8-operator synthesis and formant synthesis (hence FS), but it was a rack-mounted module and never received much attention, and so it was discontinued rapidly, with the result that units today are both hard to find and expensive.

Some subsequent products by Yamaha included FM to certain extents. The CS6x, Motif, and Motif ES lines can perform FM using the PLG150DX expansion cards, which enable monotimbral voicing with up to 16 notes of polyphony per card. The DX200 is a groovebox-style repackaging of the same expansion card into a table-top chassis with an added drum machine. It has also some basic effects and LP/HP filter with resonance. FM synthesis in PLG100-DX and PLG150-DX is identical to DX7, so in that manner it is less powerful than its predecessors, SY-77/TG-77, SY-99 and FS1R.

At the 2016 NAMM Show, Yamaha unveiled its newest generation of flagship synthesizers with the MONTAGE, which is a hybrid between the Motif XS/XF engines and a newly designed FM engine called FM-X. It is similar to how the SY77 is a hybrid between two technologies, AWM2 samples and AFM (Advanced FM). The Montage has an AWM2 engine, the same found in the Motif series, With the ability to import custom samples to the internal flashrom like the SY99. The newly designed FM-X synthesis engine is capable of delivering 8 operators in 88 algorithms, each with multiple harmonic waves along the standard sine wave found in FM. It also has the same resonant filters found in contemporary Motif synths, as well as a complex modulation interface that includes an envelope follower, motion sequencer and more. New to the Montage is the ability to process external audio and use it as a modulation source in its FM-X engine.

== Notable users ==
- Wendy Carlos
- Mike Lindup (Level 42)
- 808 State
- Eloy Fritsch
- Skinny Puppy
- Brian Eno
- Europe
- Toto
- Vangelis
- Jerry Goldsmith
- David Paich
- Chick Corea
- Front 242
- Stefan Raab
- Rudy Adrian
- Mats Olausson
- Robert Henke (Monolake)
- Masato Nakamura
- Colin Wolfe used an SY77 during the making of Dr. Dre's The Chronic, most notably the string line on "Ain't Nuthin' But a G Thang"
