= VGA-Copy =

MS-DOS software to copy floppy disks

- The GUI of VGA-Copy
- Developer: Thomas Mönkemeier
- Final release: 6.25 / February 6, 1999; 27 years ago
- Operating system: MS-DOS
- Type: Utility software
- License: Shareware

VGA-Copy is an MS-DOS program to copy floppy disks. It is able to read defective floppy disks.

== Development ==
VGA-Copy was created by the German software developer Thomas Mönkemeier. The main code was developed in Turbo Pascal; some low-level hardware parts were written in Turbo Assembler.

VGA-Copy was originally released as shareware: A free test version was spread through bulletin board systems and shareware CDs; a license key file to turn the test version into a full version could be ordered for a payment. The shareware version had two limitations: it had a ten-second waiting time on startup and it was not able to write to individual boot sectors. Later the limitations changed to requiring to enter a 5-digit number on startup.

The first public version of VGA-Copy was 2.0. Some earlier full versions were published by cdv Software Entertainment. Later versions were published under the names VGA-Copy Pro and VGA-Copy/386.

VGA-Copy Pro 5.3 was the last version to work on an Intel 286 (AT class) computer with 1MB of RAM, as well as on Micro Channel architecture systems. VGA-Copy/386 versions 6.x improved performance on modern machines, but required an Intel 386 CPU and 4MB of RAM.

In 1999 the latest version, 6.25, of VGA-Copy/386 was released as freeware without restrictions. It is still available for download on the author's web page. Later, Mönkemeier confirmed the freeware status extends to any previously released full version.

== Features ==
VGA-Copy was popular because it could often read floppy disks with errors. It does so by automatically doing multiple read retries on errors. Furthermore, VGA-Copy can read floppy images and saves them with the extension .vcp as a 1:1 raw copy of the floppy disk without special headers and formats.

A special feature of VGA-Copy is the ability to format floppies with capacities beyond the normal specifications. It is able to format floppy disks with a specified capacity of 1.4 megabytes with up to 1.7 megabytes of capacity (see also 2M). It also supports the Distribution Media Format used by Microsoft. To access such over-formatted floppies VGA-Copy delivered a special persistent DOS driver.

VGA-Copy has the ability to compress images with the ARJ packer. It is able to scan floppies for boot sector viruses with an internal heuristic and can also scan the full floppy with F-Prot.
