= IBM Extended Density Format =

The IBM eXtended Density Format (XDF) is a way of superformatting standard high-density 3½-inch and 5¼-inch floppy disks to larger-than-standard capacities. It is supported natively by IBM's PC DOS versions 7 onward and by OS/2 Warp 3 onward, using the XDF and XDFCOPY commands (directly in OS/2).

When formatted with XDF, 3½-inch floppies can hold 1860 KiB, and 5¼-inch floppies can hold 1540 KiB, using a different number of sectors as well as different sector sizes per track (not all sectors in a track are of the same size).

However, the first cylinder uses standard formatting, providing a small FAT12 filesystem that can be accessed without XDF support, and on which can be put a README file or XDF drivers. Floppy distributions of OS/2 3.0 and PC DOS 7 and later used XDF for most of the media set. Floppy disks formatted using XDF can only be read in floppy disk drives that are attached directly to the system by way of a floppy disk controller. Thus, USB-attached floppy drives cannot read XDF-formatted media.

== See also ==
- fdformat, a program that allows the formatting of high-capacity floppy disks
- Distribution Media Format, a similar diskette format used by Microsoft
- FD32MB, a technically-unrelated special floppy format supported by LS-240 SuperDisc drives also providing a small, traditionally-formatted file system containing only a README file
