= X10 accelerated floppy drive =

Floppy disk drive

X-10 Accelerated floppy drive
- Date invented: 1996
- Invented by: Team: Martin Bodo, Bob Rosenbloom, Ken Wong, Alan Lorenz and Igor Lokhmotov

The X-10 Fastcache Floppy Drive was a 1996 floppy disk drive that read 3.5-inch floppies at ten times the speed of a standard floppy drive.

== Invention ==
The drive was invented by Martin Bodo, Bob Rosenbloom, Ken Wong, Alan Lorenz and Igor Lokhmotov. Bodo said that "Slow floppies always bugged me. I saw that all the parts of a PC were getting exponentially faster, but not the floppy disk. That was the inspiration for the X-10 project."

It could read an entire floppy disk in about five seconds. The X-10 drive ran at 4x spindle speed and could write or read to both sides of the floppy simultaneously. Whenever the user inserted a disk, the drive would immediately read the entire floppy into its own custom Intel 80188 CPU-based proprietary controller card RAM. The drive used motorized ejection so it could sequence and cache writes. The drive was optimized so it could step fast enough to avoid missing tracks improving over the normal slow seek times on a standard floppy drive.

== Commercialization ==
The X10 Fastcache Floppy was offered for sale by Corporate Systems Center (CSC). It was priced, in 1996, at US$149 retail and US$100.00 OEM when standard floppy drives retailed at US$50.00. About 1,000 X-10 units were ever made.
