= Yamaha TG77 =

Audio equipment

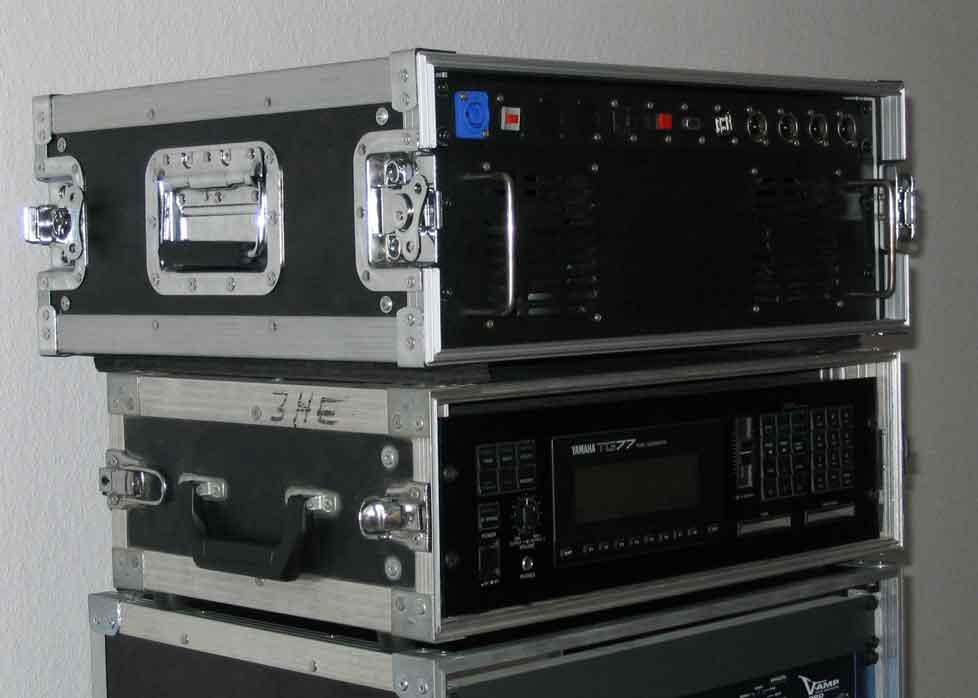
Yamaha TG77 in the rack case (middle)

Yamaha TG77 is the rack-mounted equivalent of Yamaha Corporation's SY77 synthesizer workstation. It, too, is a 16-voice multitimbral music (synthesizer) utilizing Yamaha's Advanced Frequency Modulation; Advanced Wave Memory; and the combination of these two systems, either by layering together or by modulating an AFM voice by an AWM wave, a synergy termed Realtime Convolution and Modulation Synthesis (RCM). The unit came into production in 1989, simultaneously with the SY77.

The 77 series (and its successor, the SY99) feature various filters, which digitally model those of analog equipment and include the popular feature of self-oscillation from the latter. Each of up to four Elements within a Voice can have its own filter, which can be controlled by a dedicated envelope generator. The TG77 is equipped with two sets of stereo outputs, like the SY77, and is enhanced compared to the latter by having eight individual outputs, which are assignable to individual internal instruments. Like the SY77, the TG77 has a large LCD, and programming takes place through a keypad on the front panel.

The SY/TG series can generate rich, layered, multitimbral sounds. It is capable of the characteristic timbres of DX7-style FM synthesis but can also expand upon this greatly with various new FM features (hence the A in AFM) and the addition of sampled waveforms (AWM). There are large libraries of patches and expansion cards available for the SY/TG series that enable the user to expand the tonal capabilities of the unit.
