= Distribution Media Format =

Computer floppy disk format

Distribution Media Format (DMF) is a format for floppy disks that Microsoft used to distribute software. It allowed the disk to contain 1680 KiB of data on a 3 1/2-inch disk, instead of the standard 1440 KiB. As a side effect, utilities had to specifically support the format in order to read and write the disks, which made copying of products distributed on this data storage medium more difficult. An Apple Macintosh computer running Disk Copy 6.3.3 on Mac OS 7.6 or later can copy and make DMF disks. The first Microsoft software product that uses DMF for distribution were the "c" revisions of Office 4.x. It also was the first software product to use CAB files, then called "Diamond".

Comparison of standard 1440 KiB and DMF 3 1/2-inch diskettes:

Feature	Standard	DMF
Tracks	80	80
Sectors per track	18	21
Cluster size, in bytes	512	1024 or 2048
Root directory entries	224	16

DMF, in the form of a 1680 KiB Virtual Floppy Disk (VFD) image, and IBM Extended Density Format (XDF) images are supported by Windows Virtual PC.

== See also ==
- fdformat, a DOS program that allows the formatting of high-capacity floppy disks
- IBM Extended Density Format (XDF), a high-density diskette format used by IBM
