= Floppy disk =

Removable disk storage medium

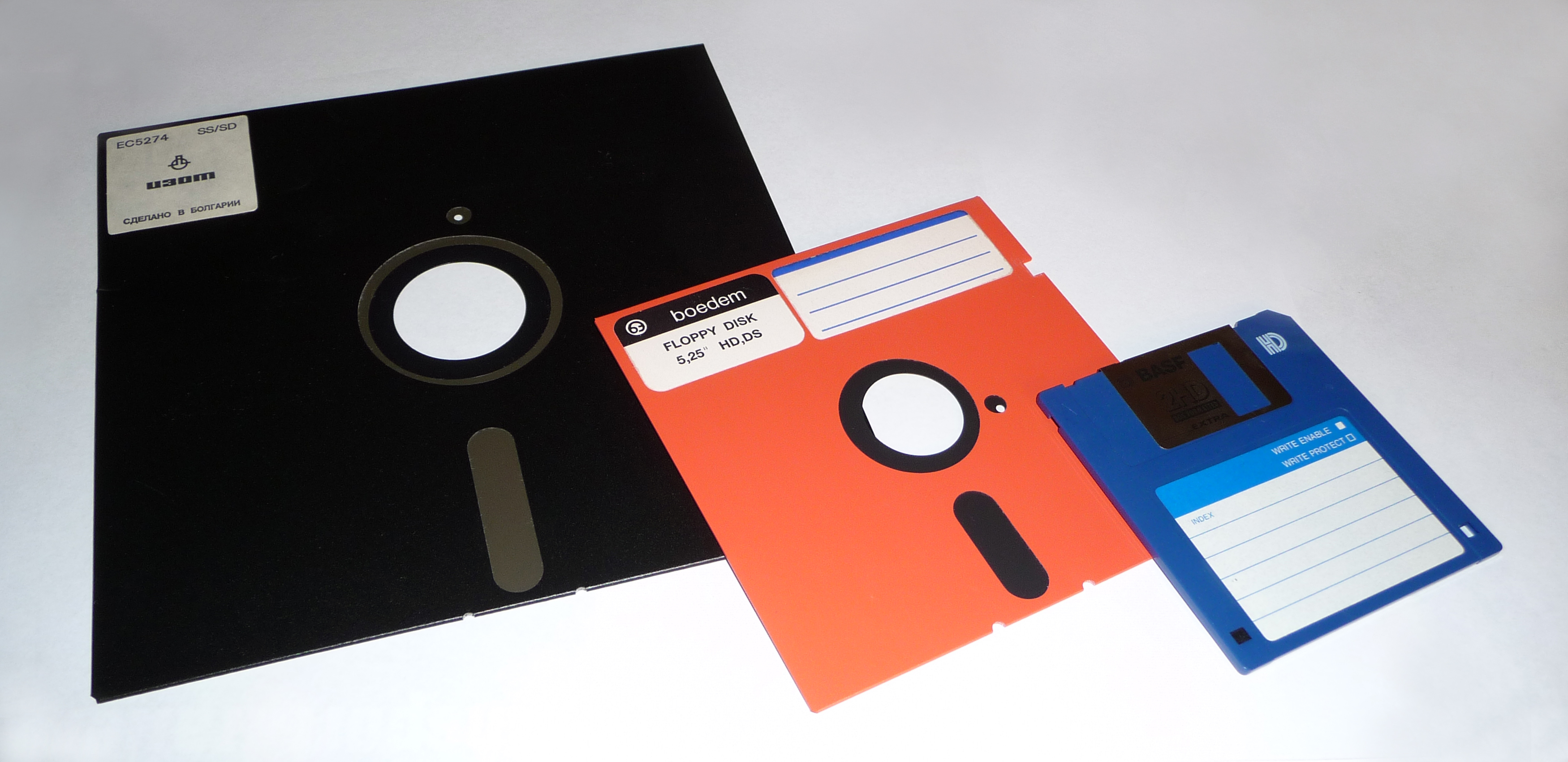
8-inch (200 mm), 5.25-inch (130 mm), and 3.5-inch (90 mm) floppy disks

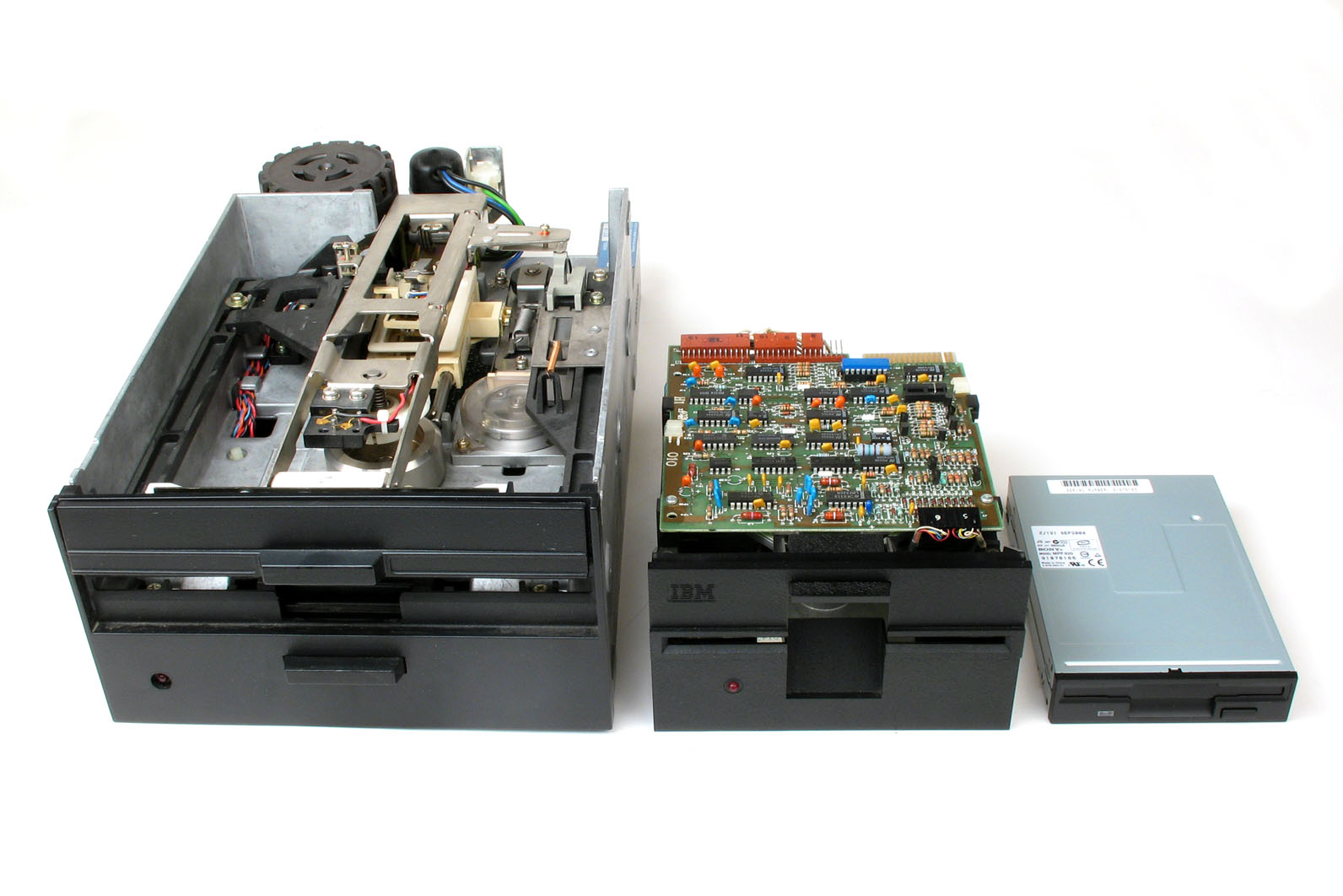
8-inch (200 mm), 5.25-inch (130 mm) (full height), and 3.5-inch (90 mm) drives

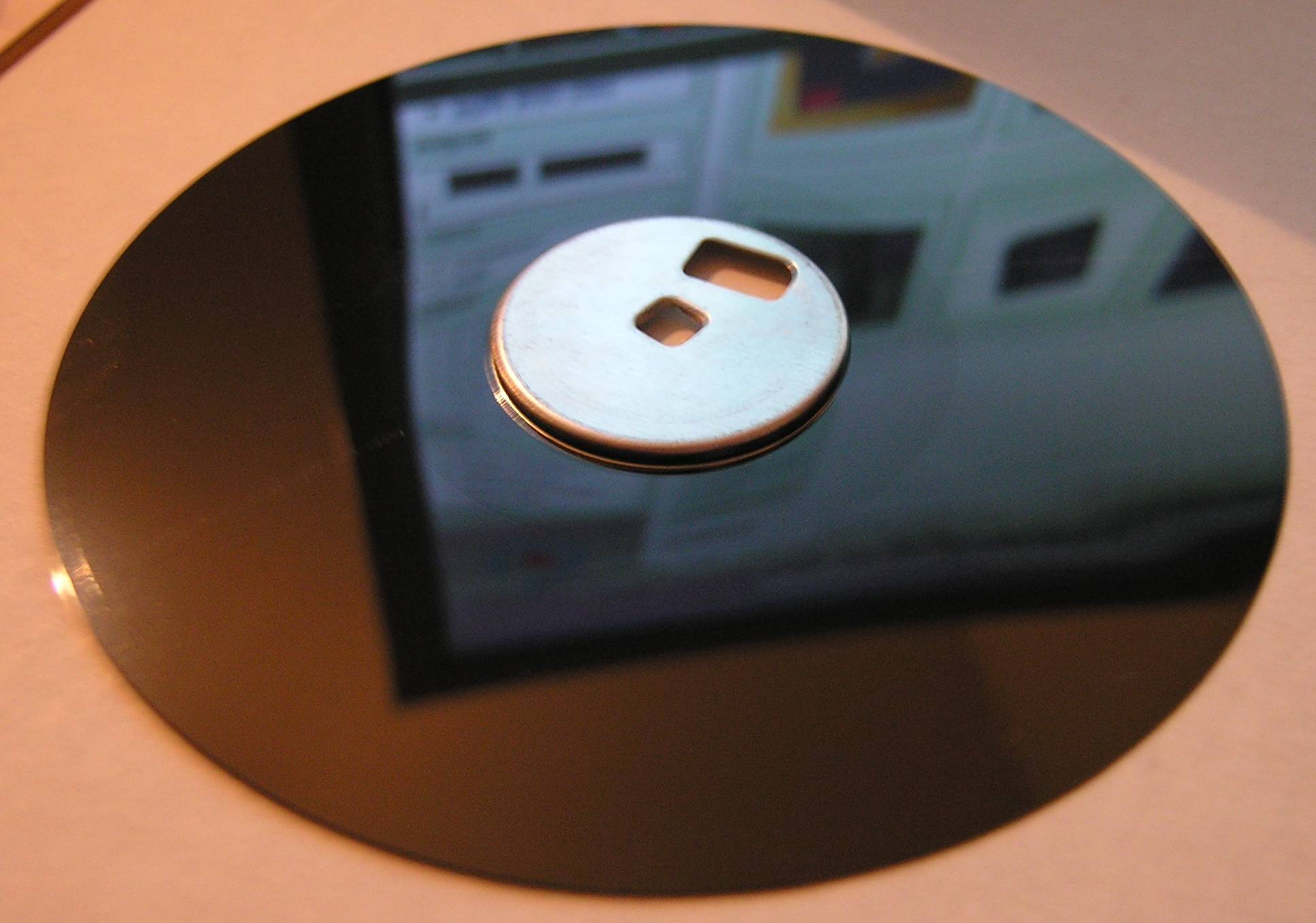
A 3.5-inch (90 mm) floppy disk removed from its housing

A floppy disk, diskette, or floppy diskette is a type of disk storage made from a thin, flexible disk coated with a magnetic storage medium. It is enclosed in a square or nearly square plastic shell lined with fabric to help remove dust from the spinning disk. Floppy disks store digital data, which can be read or written when inserted into a floppy disk drive (FDD) connected to or built into a computer or other device. The three most popular types of floppy disks (and their drives) are the 8-inch, 5¼-inch, and 3½-inch versions.

The first floppy disks, invented and made by IBM in 1971, had a disk diameter of 8 inches. Subsequently, the 5¼-inch and then the 3½-inch became a ubiquitous form of data storage and data transfer into the first years of the 21st century. By the end of the 1980s, 5¼-inch disks had been superseded by 3½-inch disks. During this time, PCs frequently came equipped with drives of both sizes. By the mid-1990s, 5¼-inch drives had nearly disappeared, the 3½-inch disk became the dominant format. The advantages of the 3½-inch disk are its higher capacity, smaller physical size, and rigid case which provided better protection from dirt and other environmental risks.

Floppy disks were so common in late 20th-century culture that many electronic and software programs continue to use save icons that look like floppy disks well into the 21st century, as a form of skeuomorphic design. While floppy disk drives still have some limited uses, especially with legacy industrial computer equipment, they have been superseded by data storage methods with much greater data storage capacity and data transfer speed, such as USB flash drives, memory cards, optical discs, and storage available through local computer networks and cloud storage.

== Categories ==
Industry observers categorize floppy disks and floppy disk drives according to size and capacity with four major categories being 8 inches (200 mm), 5.25 inches (130 mm), 3.5 inches (90 mm) and high-capacity floppy disks and floppy disk drives. There were in addition, variant products that did not fit these categories. The distinguishing characteristic between the high-capacity products and their lower capacity brethren, frequently categorized as standard floppies, was the use of servomechanisms to increase the number of tracks and thereby increase capacity. The four categories each represented generations; from the beginning each generation had substantially greater market success and ultimately succeeded the previous one, but the high-capacity floppy generation, although having some success, was never as successful as the prior 3½-inch (90 mm) generation, and became essentially obsolete by 2011.

While the original IBM 8-inch (200 mm) disk was actually so defined, the other sizes are defined in millimeters, their names being but rough approximations.

Different sizes of floppy disks are mechanically incompatible, and disks can fit only one size of drive. Drive assemblies with both 3.5-inch (90 mm) and 5.25-inch (130 mm) slots were available during the transition period between the sizes, but they contained two separate drive mechanisms. As computer platforms began to form, attempts were made at interchangeability. Apple's later 1.44 MB high-density 3½-inch drives (marketed as the SuperDrive) could read, write, and format IBM PC–compatible floppy disks. However, few IBM-compatible computers were able to read or write Apple-formatted floppy disks. The limitation was due not to the 3½-inch drive mechanism itself, but to the disk controller and its lack of support for Apple's GCR (group coded recording) encoding used on 400 kB and 800 kB Macintosh disks.

8 in (200 mm), 5.25 in (130 mm) and 3.5 in (90 mm) drives were manufactured in a variety of sizes, most to fit standardized drive bays. Alongside the common disk sizes were non-classical sizes for specialized systems.

== History ==
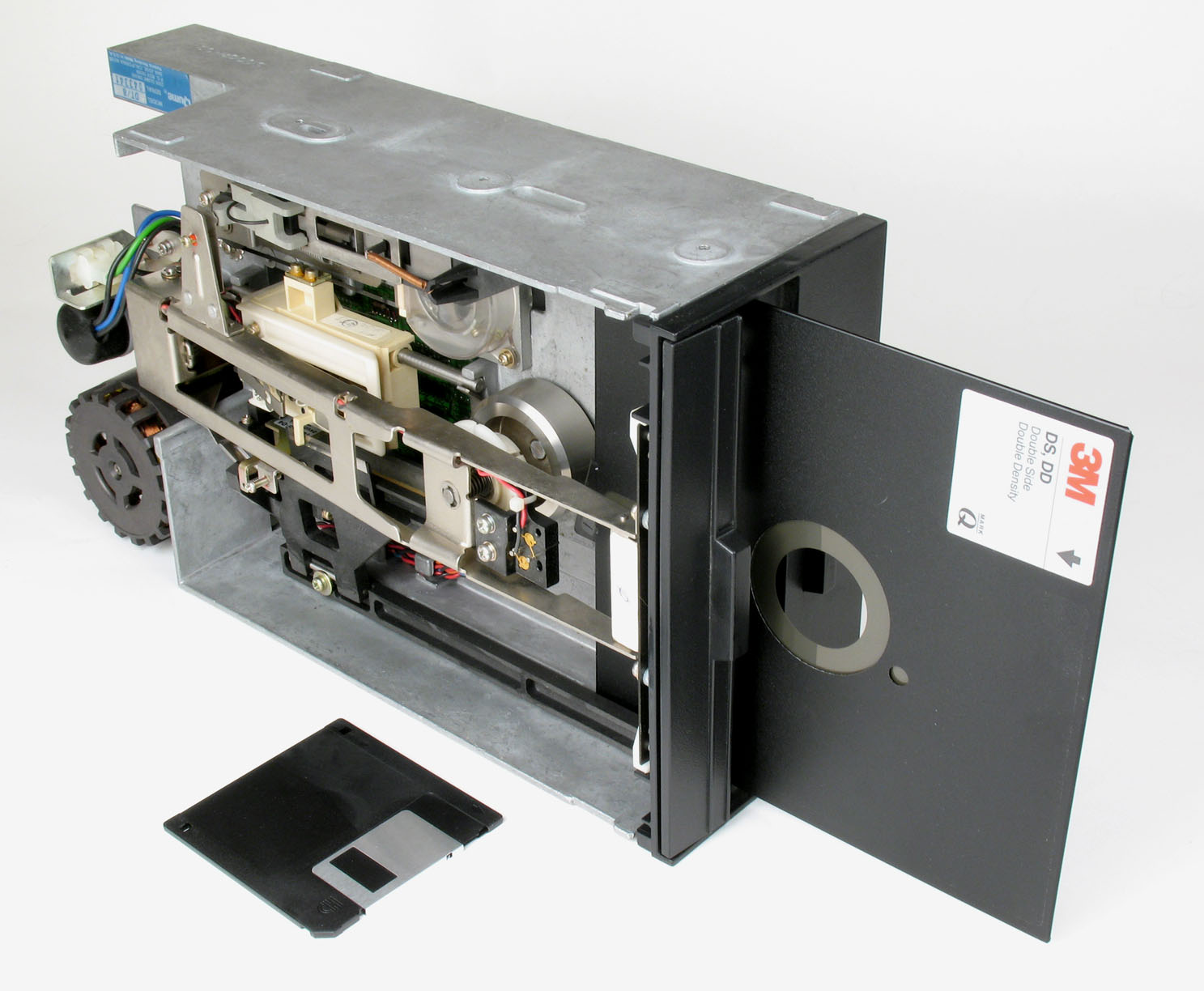
8-inch (200 mm) floppy disk, partially inserted in drive, (3.5-inch (90 mm) floppy diskette, in front, shown for scale)

=== 8-inch ===
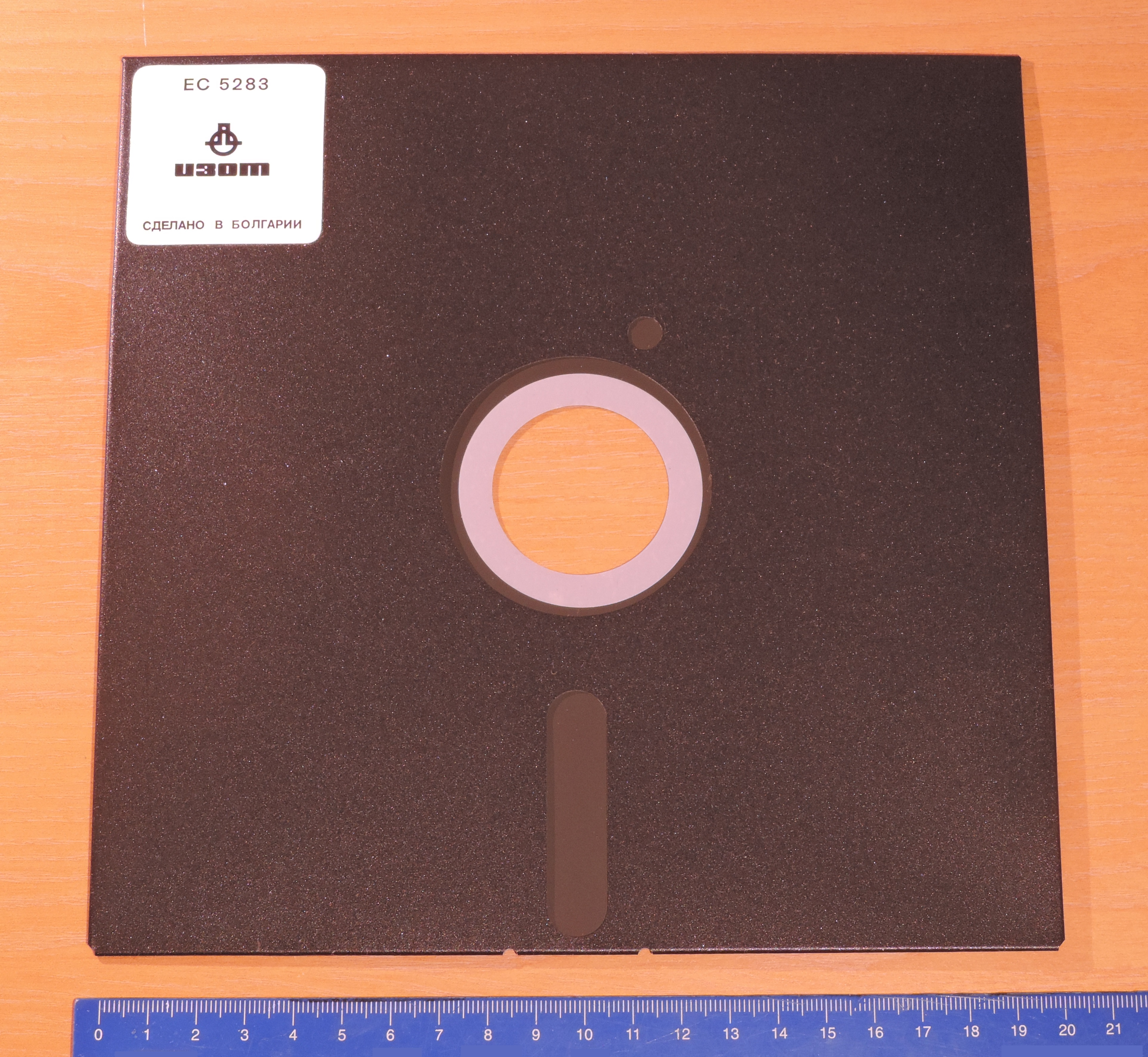
8-inch (200 mm) floppy disk

The first commercial floppy disks, developed in the late 1960s, were 8 inches (200 mm) in diameter; they became commercially available in 1971 as a component of IBM products and both drives and disks were then sold separately starting in 1972 by Memorex and others. These disks and associated drives were produced and improved upon by IBM and other companies such as Memorex, Shugart Associates, and Burroughs Corporation. The term "floppy disk" appeared in print as early as 1970, and although IBM announced its first media as the Type 1 Diskette in 1973, the industry continued to use the terms "floppy disk" or "floppy".

Floppy disks of the first standard are 8 inches (200 mm) in diameter, protected by a flexible plastic jacket. It was a read-only device used by IBM as a way of loading microcode. Read/write floppy disks and their drives became available in 1972, but it was IBM's 1973 introduction of the 3740 data entry system that began the establishment of floppy disks, called by IBM the Diskette 1, as an industry standard for information interchange. Diskettes formatted for this system stored 242,944 bytes. Early microcomputers used for engineering, business, or word processing often used one or more 8-inch disk drives for removable storage; the CP/M operating system was developed for microcomputers with 8-inch drives.

The family of 8-inch (200 mm) disks and drives increased over time and later versions could store up to 1.2 MB; many microcomputer applications did not need that much capacity on one disk, so a smaller size disk with lower-cost media and drives was feasible. The 5.25-inch (130 mm) drive succeeded the 8-inch (200 mm) in many applications, and developed to the same storage capacity as the larger 8-inch (200 mm) size, using higher-density media and recording techniques.

=== 5¼-inch ===
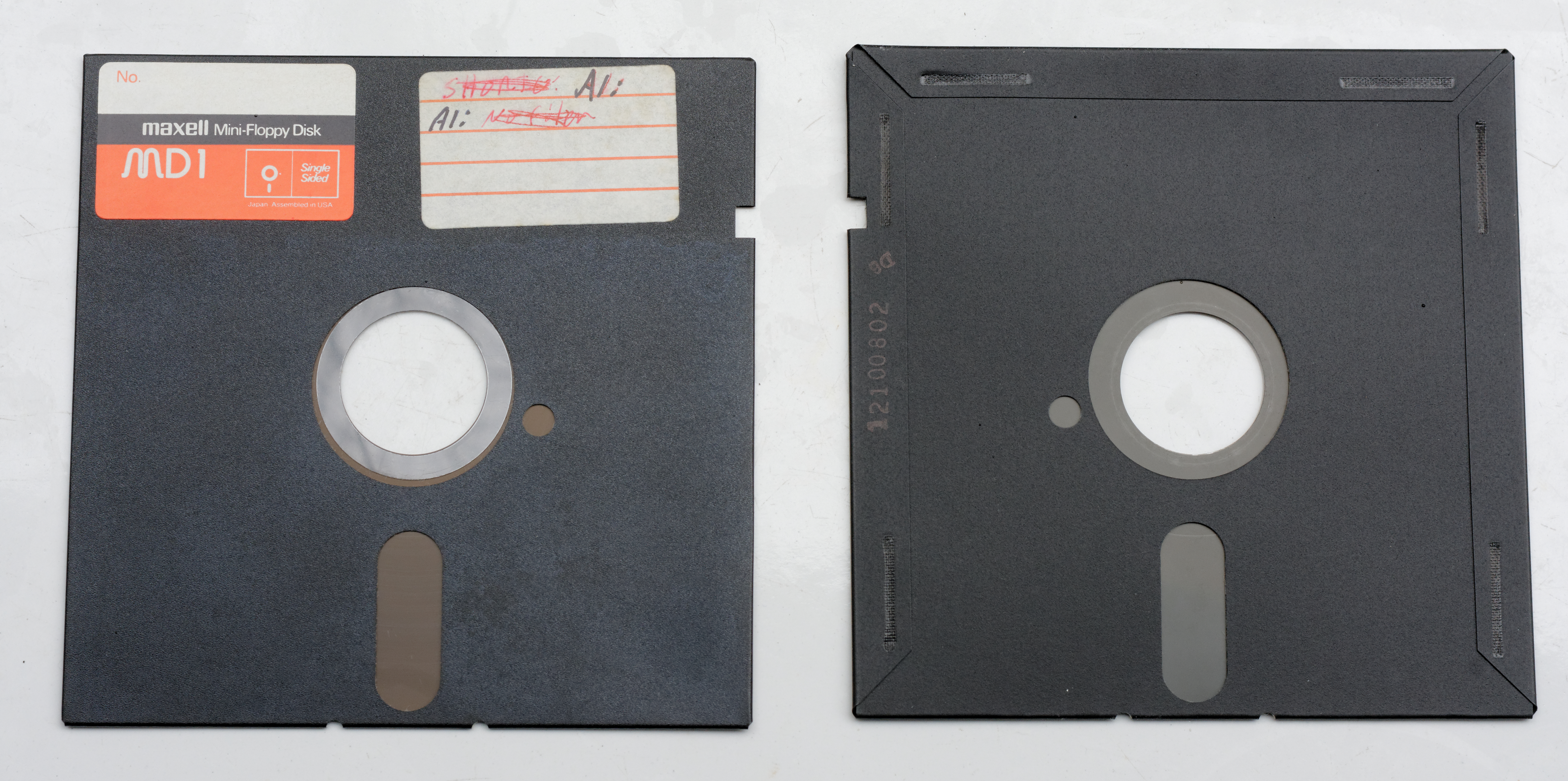
5.25-inch (130 mm) floppies, front and back

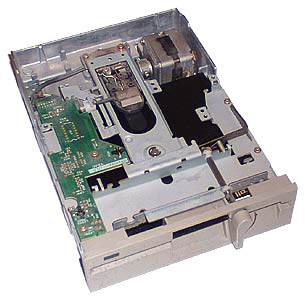
Uncovered 5.25-inch (130 mm) disk mechanism with disk inserted

In 1976, Shugart Associates introduced the 5.25-inch (130 mm) floppy disk drive. By 1978, there were more than ten manufacturers producing such drives. There were competing floppy disk formats, with hard- and soft-sector versions and encoding schemes such as differential Manchester encoding (DM), modified frequency modulation (MFM), M^{2}FM and group coded recording (GCR). The 5.25-inch (130 mm) format displaced the 8-inch (200 mm) one for most uses, and the hard-sectored disk format disappeared. The most common capacity of the 5.25-inch (130 mm) format in DOS-based PCs was 360 KB (368,640 bytes) for the Double-Sided Double-Density (DSDD) format using MFM encoding.

In 1984, IBM introduced its PC/AT with the 1.2 MB (1,228,800 bytes) dual-sided 5.25-inch (130 mm) floppy disk, but it never became very popular.

Throughout the early 1980s, limits of the 5.25-inch (130 mm) format became clear. Originally designed to be more practical than the 8-inch (200 mm) format, it was considered too large; as the quality of recording media grew, data could be stored in a smaller area. Several solutions were developed, with drives at 2-, 2½-, 3-, 3¼-, 3½- and 4-inches (and Sony's 90 mm × 94 mm (3.54 in × 3.70 in) disk) offered by various companies. They all had several advantages over the old format, including a rigid case with a sliding metal (or later, sometimes plastic) shutter over the head slot, which helped protect the delicate magnetic medium from dust and damage, and a sliding write protection tab, which was far more convenient than the adhesive tabs used with earlier disks. The established market for the 5.25-inch (130 mm) format made it difficult for these mutually incompatible new formats to gain significant market share. A variant on the Sony design, introduced in 1983 by many manufacturers, was then rapidly adopted. By 1988, the 3.5-inch (90 mm) was outselling the 5.25-inch (130 mm).

The head gap of an 80‑track high-density (1.2 MB in the MFM format) 5.25-inch (130 mm) drive (a.k.a. mini diskette, Mini disk, or Minifloppy) is smaller than that of a 40‑track double-density (360 KB if double-sided) drive but can also format, read and write 40‑track disks provided the controller supports double stepping or has a switch to do so. A blank 40‑track disk formatted and written on an 80‑track drive can be taken to its native drive without problems, and a disk formatted on a 40‑track drive can be used on an 80‑track drive. Disks written on a 40‑track drive and then updated on an 80 track drive become unreadable on any 40‑track drives due to track width incompatibility.

Single-sided disks were coated on both sides. The reason usually given for the higher price was that double sided disks were certified error-free on both sides of the media. Double-sided disks could be used in some drives for single-sided disks, as long as an index signal was not needed. This was done one side at a time, by turning them over (flippy disks); more expensive dual-head drives which could read both sides without turning over were later produced, and eventually became used universally.

=== 3½-inch ===
Internal parts of a 3.5 inches (90 mm) floppy disk. 1) Hole indicates a high-capacity disk. 2) Hub engages with the drive motor. 3) Shutter protects the surface. 4) Plastic housing. 5) Polyester sheet reduces friction. 6) Magnetic-coated plastic disk. 7) Schematic of one sector (tracks/sectors not visible on real disks). 8) Write protection tab.

In the early 1980s, many manufacturers introduced smaller floppy drives and media in various formats. A consortium of 21 companies eventually settled on a 3.5-inch (90 mm) design known as the Micro diskette, Micro disk, or Micro floppy, similar to a Sony design but improved to support both single-sided and double-sided media, with formatted capacities generally of 360 kB and 720 kB respectively. Single-sided drives of the consortium design first shipped in 1983, and double-sided in 1984. The double-sided, high-density 1.44 MB (actually 1440 KiB = 1.41 MiB or 1.47 MB) disk drive, which would become the most popular, first shipped in 1986.

IBM started using the 720 KB double density 3.5-inch (90 mm) microfloppy disk on its Convertible laptop computer in 1986 and the 1.44 MB (1,474,560 bytes) high-density version with the IBM Personal System/2 (PS/2) line in 1987. These disk drives could be added to older PC models. In 1988, Y-E Data introduced a drive for 2.88 MB Double-Sided Extended-Density (DSED) diskettes which was used by IBM in its top-of-the-line PS/2 and some RS/6000 models and in the second-generation NeXTcube and NeXTstation; however, this format had limited market success due to lack of standards and movement to 1.44 MB drives.

The first Macintosh computers used single-sided 3.5-inch (90 mm) floppy disks, but with 400 kB formatted capacity. These were followed in 1986 by double-sided 800 kB floppies. The higher capacity was achieved at the same recording density by varying the disk-rotation speed with head position so that the linear speed of the disk was closer to constant. Later Macs could also read and write 1.44 MB HD disks in PC format with fixed rotation speed. Higher capacities were similarly achieved by Acorn's RISC OS (800 kB for DD, 1,600 kB for HD) and AmigaOS (880 kB for DD, 1,760 kB for HD).

Most 3.5-inch (90 mm) disks have a rectangular hole in one corner which, if obstructed, write-enables the disk. A sliding detented piece can be moved to block or reveal the part of the rectangular hole that is sensed by the drive. The HD 1.44 MB disks have a second, unobstructed hole in the opposite corner that identifies them as being of that capacity.

In IBM-compatible PCs, higher-density 3.5-inch (90 mm) floppy drives can read lower-density media, but writing and formatting across densities has reliability issues and was not officially supported by manufacturers. Writing at different densities than those at which disks were intended, sometimes by altering the density detection hole, was possible but not supported by manufacturers. A hole on one side of a 3.5-inch (90 mm) disk can be altered to make some disk drives and operating systems treat the disk as one of higher or lower density, for bidirectional compatibility or economic reasons. Some computers, such as the PS/2 and Acorn Archimedes, ignored these holes altogether.

Generally, the term floppy disk persisted, even though later style floppy disks have a rigid case around an internal floppy disk.

=== High-capacity ===
A number of attempts were made by various companies to introduce newer floppy-disk formats, frequently characterized as a "super floppy," with many based on the standard 3½-inch physical form while offering much higher capacity. Many of these products provide the ability to read and write standard DD and HD disks. Some manufacturers offered high‑capacity floppy disk drives as standard components on their PCs (e.g. SuperDisk), but these drives never achieved the level of industry‑wide standardization reached by earlier floppy disk designs. They were later largely replaced first by optical disc burners and then by flash storage.

In 1990, an attempt was made to standardize details for a 20MB 3½-inch format floppy. At the time, "three different technologies that are not interchangeable" existed. One major goal was that the to-be-developed standard drive be backward compatible: that it be able to read 720 KB and 1.44 MB floppies.

=== Variants ===
Other smaller floppy sizes were proposed, especially for portable or pocket-sized devices that needed a smaller storage device.

- 3¼-inch floppies otherwise similar to 5¼-inch floppies were proposed by Tabor and Dysan.
- Three-inch disks similar in construction to 3½-inch were manufactured and used for a time, particularly by Amstrad computers and word processors.
- A two-inch nominal size known as the Video Floppy was introduced by Sony for use with its Mavica still video camera.
- An incompatible two-inch floppy produced by Fujifilm called the LT-1 was used in the Zenith Minisport portable computer.

None of these sizes achieved much market success.

=== Obsolescence ===
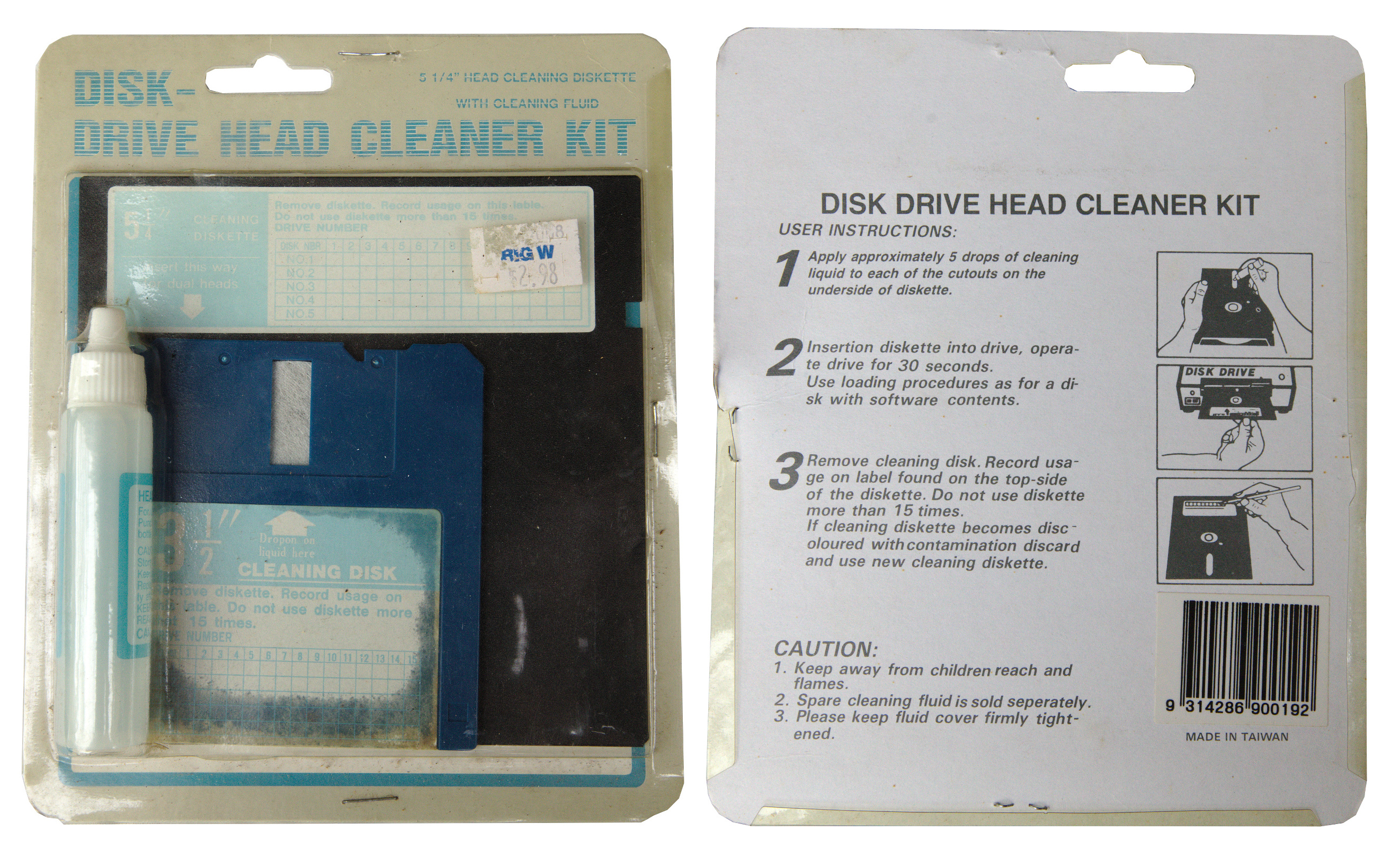
Front and rear of a retail 3½-inch and 5¼-inch floppy disk drive cleaning kit, as sold in Australia at retailer Big W, circa early 1990s

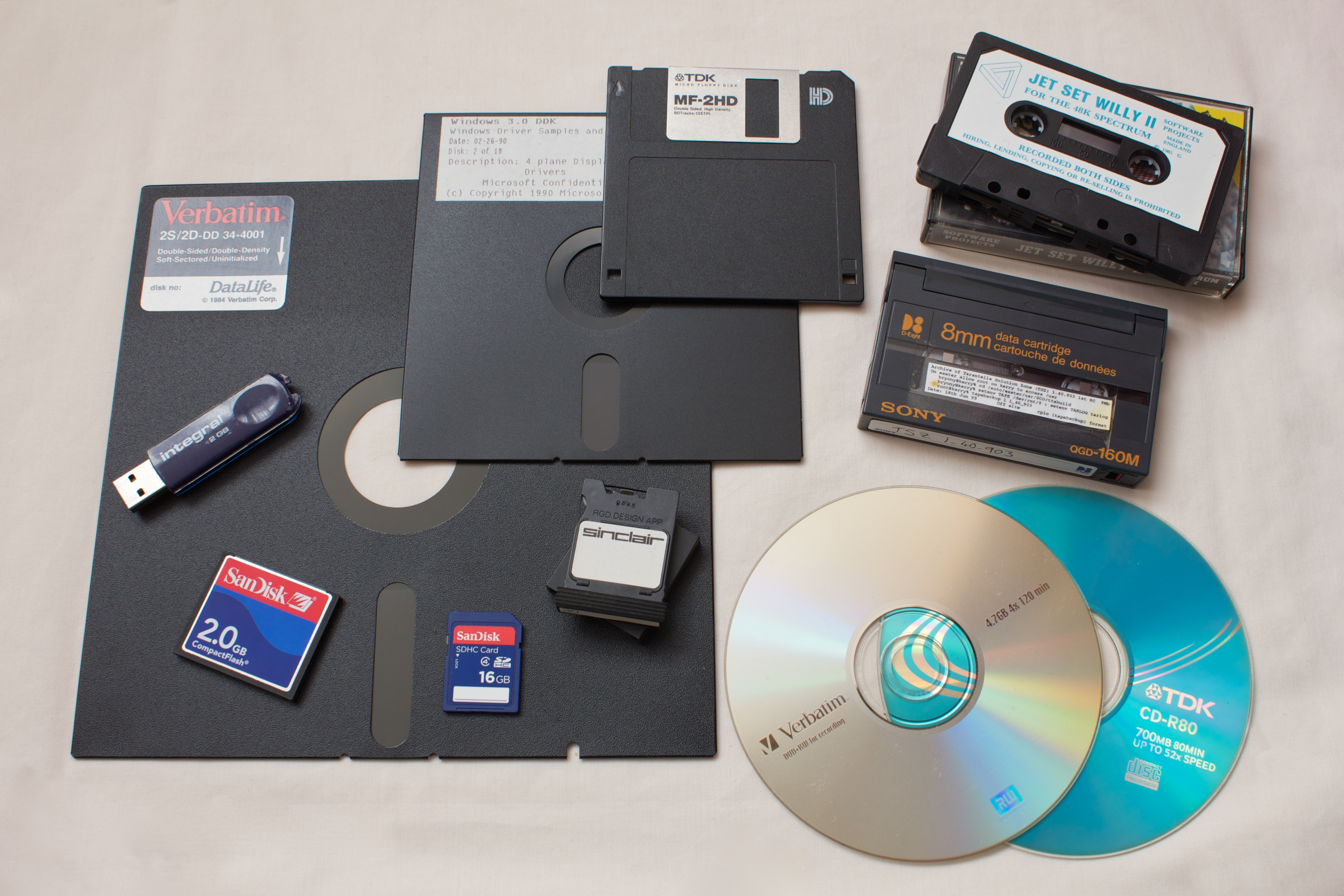
A collection of removable data storage media: Floppy disks, flash memory media, tape-based media, and optical discs

In the mid-1990s, mechanically incompatible higher-density floppy disks were introduced, like the Iomega Zip disk. Adoption was limited by the competition between proprietary formats and the need to buy expensive drives for computers where the disks would be used. In some cases, failure in market penetration was exacerbated by the release of higher-capacity versions of the drive and media being not backward-compatible with the original drives, dividing the users between new and old adopters. Consumers were wary of making costly investments into unproven and rapidly changing technologies, so none of the technologies became the established standard.

Apple introduced the iMac G3 in 1998 with a CD-ROM drive but no floppy drive; this made USB-connected floppy drives popular accessories, as the iMac came without any writable removable media device.

Recordable CDs were touted as an alternative, because of the greater capacity, compatibility with existing CD-ROM drives, and—with the advent of re-writeable CDs and packet writing—a similar reusability as floppy disks. However, CD-R/RWs remained mostly an archival medium, not a medium for exchanging data or editing files on the medium itself, because there was no common standard for packet writing which allowed for small updates. Other formats, such as magneto-optical discs, had the flexibility of floppy disks combined with greater capacity, but remained niche due to costs. High-capacity backward compatible floppy technologies became popular for a while and were sold as an option or even included in standard PCs, but in the long run, their use was limited to professionals and enthusiasts.

Flash-based USB thumb drives finally provided a practical and popular replacement that supported traditional file systems and all common usage scenarios of floppy disks once the USB mass storage device class eliminated the need for proprietary drivers. As opposed to other solutions, no new drive type or special software was required that impeded adoption, since all that was necessary was an already common USB port.

=== Usage in the 21st century ===
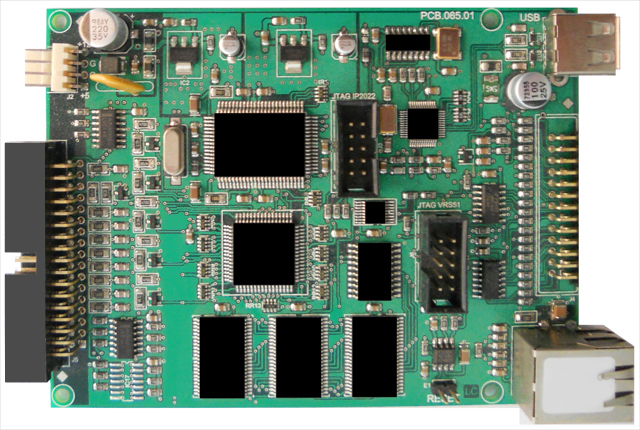
A floppy hardware emulator, same size as a 3½-inch drive, provides a USB interface to the user.

In 2002, most manufacturers still provided floppy disk drives as standard equipment to meet user demand for file transfer and an emergency boot device, as well as for the general secure feeling of having the familiar device. By this time, the retail cost of a floppy drive had fallen to around $20 (equivalent to $36 in 2025), so there was little financial incentive to omit the device from a system. Subsequently, enabled by the widespread support for USB flash drives and BIOS boot, manufacturers and retailers progressively reduced the availability of floppy disk drives as standard equipment. In February 2003, Dell, one of the leading personal computer vendors, announced that floppy drives would no longer be pre-installed on Dell Dimension home computers, although they were still available as a selectable option and purchasable as an aftermarket OEM add-on. By January 2007, only 2% of computers sold in stores contained built-in floppy disk drives.

Floppy disks are used for emergency boots in aging systems lacking support for other bootable media and for BIOS updates, since most BIOS and firmware programs can still be executed from bootable floppy disks. If BIOS updates fail or become corrupt, floppy drives can sometimes be used to perform a recovery. The music and theatre industries still use equipment requiring standard floppy disks (e.g. synthesizers, samplers, drum machines, sequencers, and lighting consoles). Industrial automation equipment such as programmable machinery and industrial robots may not have a USB interface; data and programs are then loaded from disks, damageable in industrial environments. This equipment may not be replaced due to cost or requirement for continuous availability; existing software emulation and virtualization do not solve this problem because a customized operating system is used that has no drivers for USB devices. Hardware floppy disk emulators can be made to interface floppy-disk controllers to a USB port that can be used for flash drives.

In May 2016, the United States Government Accountability Office released a report that covered the need to upgrade or replace legacy computer systems within federal agencies. According to this document, old IBM Series/1 minicomputers running on 8-inch floppy disks are still used to coordinate "the operational functions of the United States' nuclear forces". The government planned to update some of the technology by the end of the 2017 fiscal year. The update was completed in June 2019.

Use in Japan's government ended in 2024.

Windows 10 and Windows 11 no longer come with drivers for floppy disk drives (both internal and external). However, they will still support them with a separate device driver provided by Microsoft.

The British Airways Boeing 747-400 fleet, up to its retirement in 2020, used 3½-inch floppy disks to load avionics software.

Sony, who had been in the floppy disk business since 1983, ended domestic sales of all six 3½-inch floppy disk models as of March 2011. Wired magazine called it "the death of the floppy disk." While production of new floppy disk media has ceased, sales and uses of this media from inventories is expected to continue until at least 2026.

In November 2026, the U.S. Federal Aviation Administration announced plans to phase out its use of floppy disks at air traffic control towers by the end of 2028.

== Structure ==
=== 8-inch and 5¼-inch disks ===
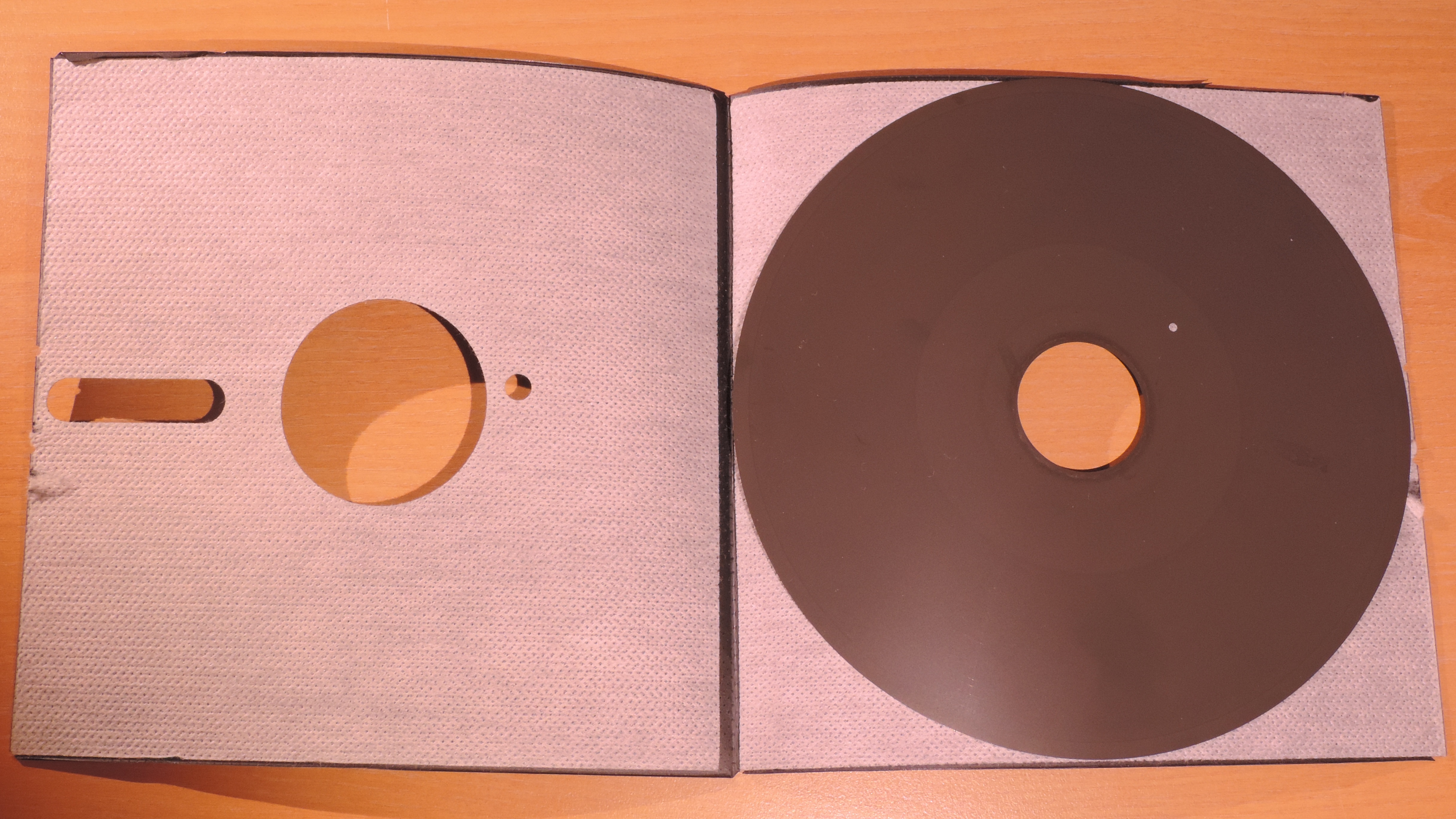
The inside of a destructively disassembled 8-inch floppy disk

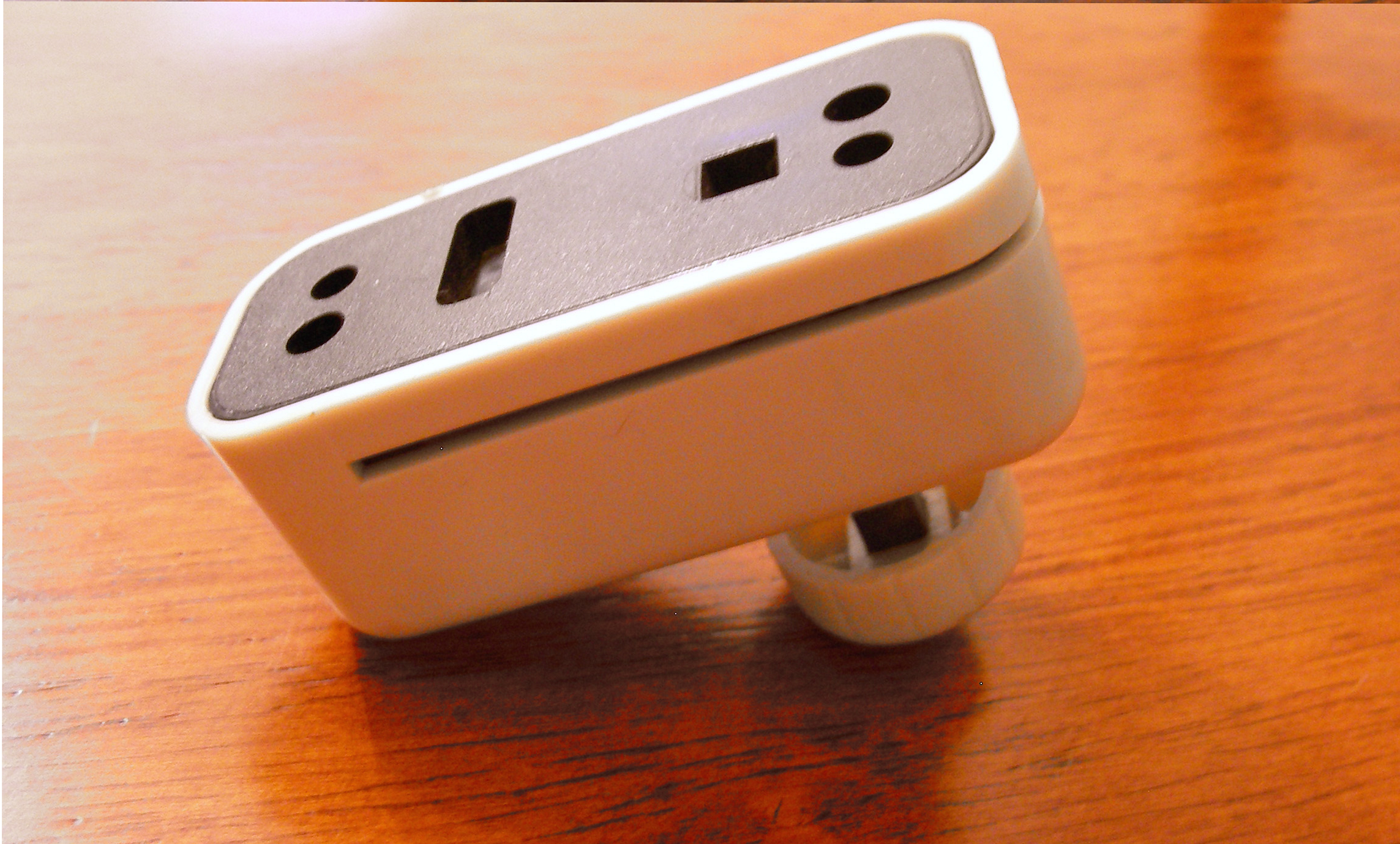
A disk notcher punch, which could make read-only 5¼" floppies writable, and convert certain single-sided 5¼-inch diskettes to double-sided

The 8-inch and 5¼-inch floppy disks contain a magnetically coated round plastic medium with a large circular hole in the center for a drive's spindle. The medium is contained in a square plastic cover that has a small oblong opening in both sides to allow the drive's heads to read and write data and a large hole in the center to allow the magnetic medium to spin by rotating it from its middle hole.

Inside the cover are two layers of fabric with the magnetic medium sandwiched in the middle. The fabric is designed to reduce friction between the medium and the outer cover, and catch particles of debris abraded off the disk to keep them from accumulating on the heads. The cover is usually a one-part sheet, double-folded with flaps glued or spot-welded together.

A small notch on the side of the disk identifies whether it is writable, as detected by a mechanical switch or photoelectric sensor. In the 8-inch disk, the notch being covered or not present enables writing, while in the 5¼-inch disk, the notch being present and uncovered enables writing. Tape may be used over the notch to change the mode of the disk. Punch devices were sold to convert read-only 5¼" disks to writable ones, and also to enable writing on the unused side of single-sided disks for computers with single-sided drives. The latter worked because single- and double-sided disks typically contained essentially identical actual magnetic media, for manufacturing efficiency. Disks whose obverse and reverse sides were thus used separately in single-sided drives were known as flippy disks. Disk notching 5¼" floppies for PCs was generally only required where users wanted to overwrite original 5¼" disks of store-bought software, which somewhat commonly shipped with no notch present.

Another LED/photo-transistor pair located near the center of the disk detects the index hole once per rotation in the magnetic disk. Detection occurs whenever the drive's sensor, the holes in the correctly inserted floppy's plastic envelope and a single hole in the rotating floppy disk medium line up. This mechanism is used to detect the angular start of each track, and whether or not the disk is rotating at the correct speed. Early 8‑inch and 5¼‑inch disks also had holes for each sector in the enclosed magnetic medium, in addition to the index hole, with the same radial distance from the center, for alignment with the same envelope hole. These were termed hard sectored disks. Later soft-sectored disks have only one index hole in the medium, and sector position is determined by the disk controller or low-level software from patterns marking the start of a sector. Generally, the same drives are used to read and write both types of disks, with only the disks and controllers differing. Some operating systems using soft sectors, such as Apple DOS, do not use the index hole, and the drives designed for such systems often lack the corresponding sensor; this was mainly a hardware cost-saving measure.

=== 3½-inch (90 mm) disk ===
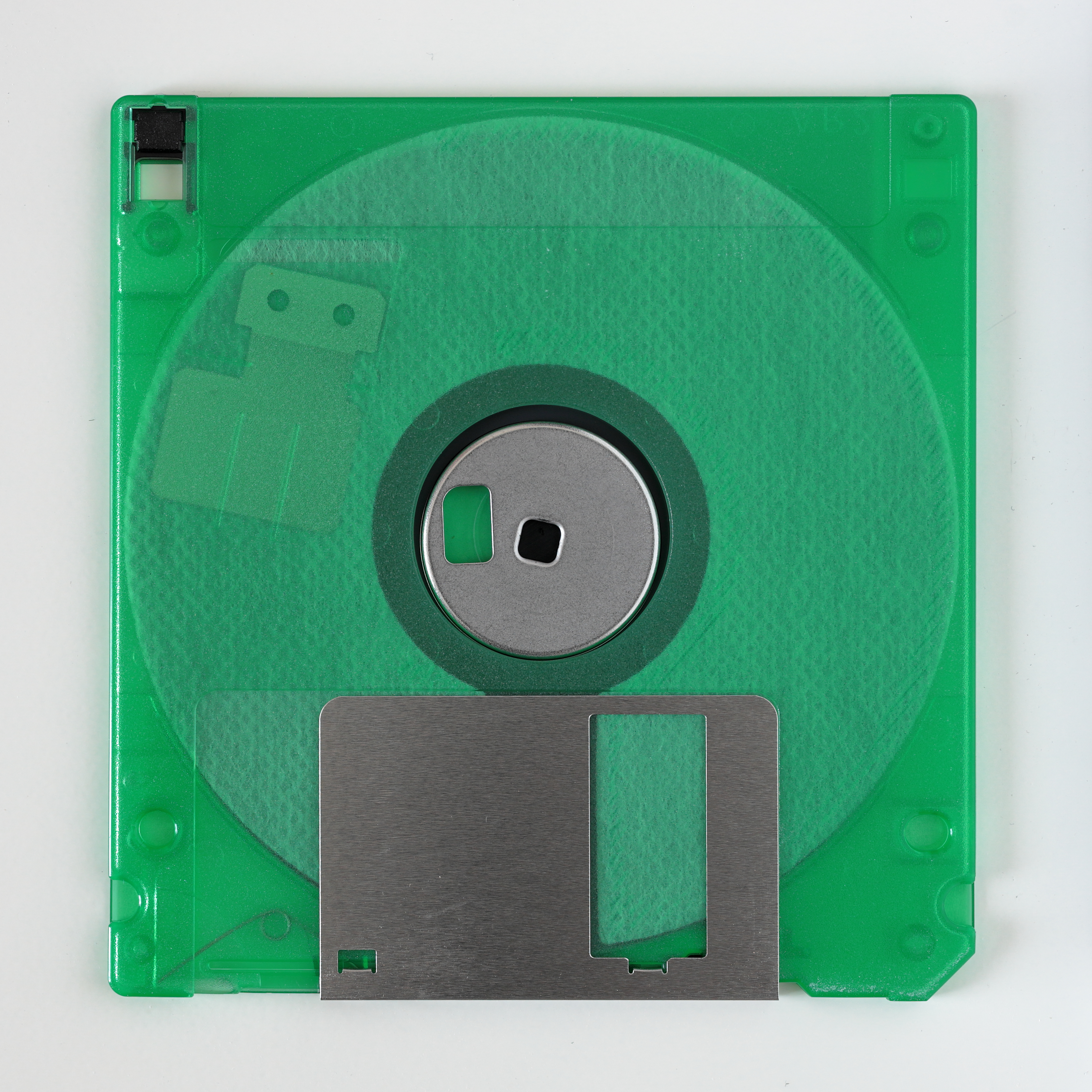
Rear side of a 3½-inch floppy disk in a transparent case, showing its internal parts

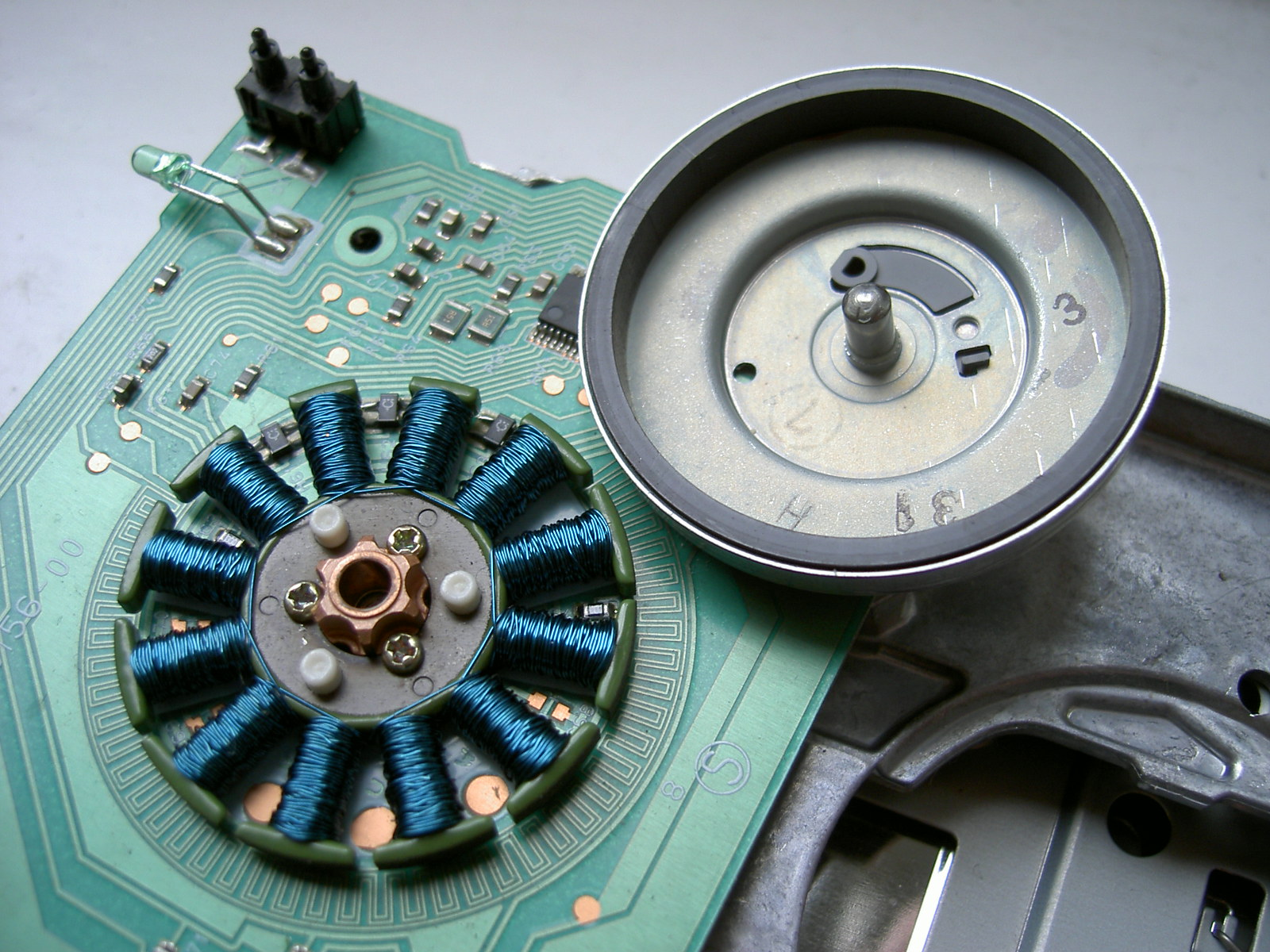
The spindle motor from a 3½‑inch unit

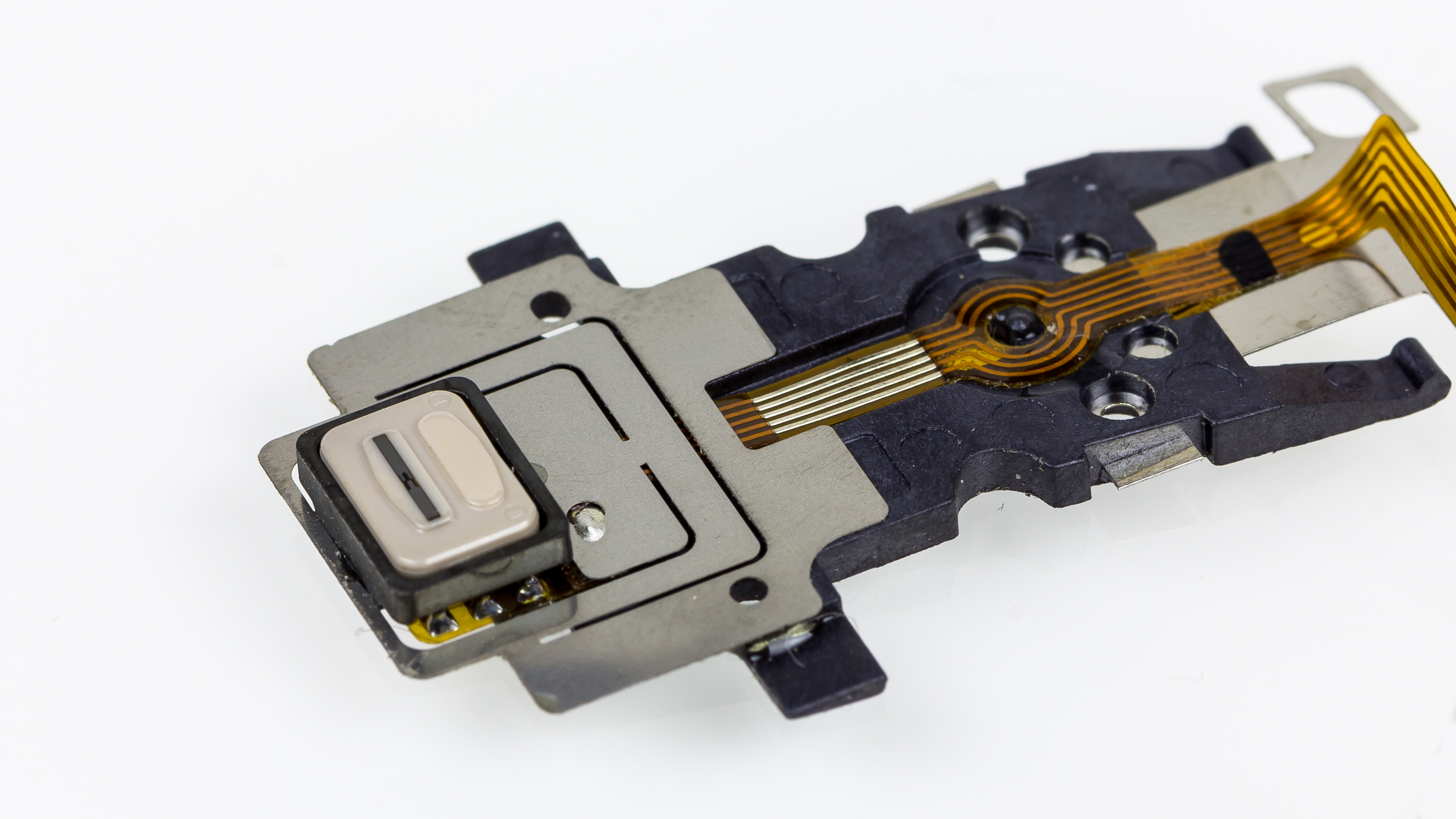
A read-write head from a 3½‑inch unit

The core of the 3.5 in (90 mm) disk is the same as the other two disks, but the front has only a label and a small opening for reading and writing data, protected by the shutter—a spring-loaded metal or plastic cover, pushed to the side on entry into the drive. Rather than having a hole in the center, it has a metal hub which mates to the spindle of the drive.

Typical 3.5 in (90 mm) disk magnetic coating materials are:

- DD: 2 μm magnetic iron oxide
- HD: 1.2 μm cobalt-doped iron oxide
- ED: 3 μm barium ferrite

Two holes at the bottom left and right indicate whether the disk is write-protected and whether it is high-density; these holes are spaced as far apart as the holes in punched A4 paper, allowing write-protected high-density floppy disks to be clipped into international standard (ISO 838) ring binders One of the chief usability problems of the floppy disk is its vulnerability; even inside a closed plastic housing, the disk medium is highly sensitive to dust, condensation and temperature extremes. As with all magnetic storage, it is vulnerable to magnetic fields. Blank disks have been distributed with an extensive set of warnings, cautioning the user not to expose it to dangerous conditions. Rough treatment or removing the disk from the drive while the magnetic media is still spinning is likely to cause damage to the disk, drive head, or stored data. On the other hand, the 3½‑inch floppy disk has been lauded for its mechanical usability by human–computer interaction expert Donald Norman:

=== High-capacity disks ===
The main technological change for the higher-capacity formats was the addition of tracking information on the disk surface to allow the read/write heads to be positioned more accurately. Most earlier generations of floppy disks have no such information, so the drives use open loop positioning by a stepper motor in order to position their heads over the desired track. For good interoperability of disks among drives, this requires precise alignment of the drive heads to a reference standard, somewhat similar to the alignment required to get the best performance out of an audio tape deck. The newer systems generally use position information on the surfaces of the disk to find the tracks, allowing the track width to be greatly reduced.

The following summarizes specific structural differences in the several high-capacity FDs with more details contained in linked articles:

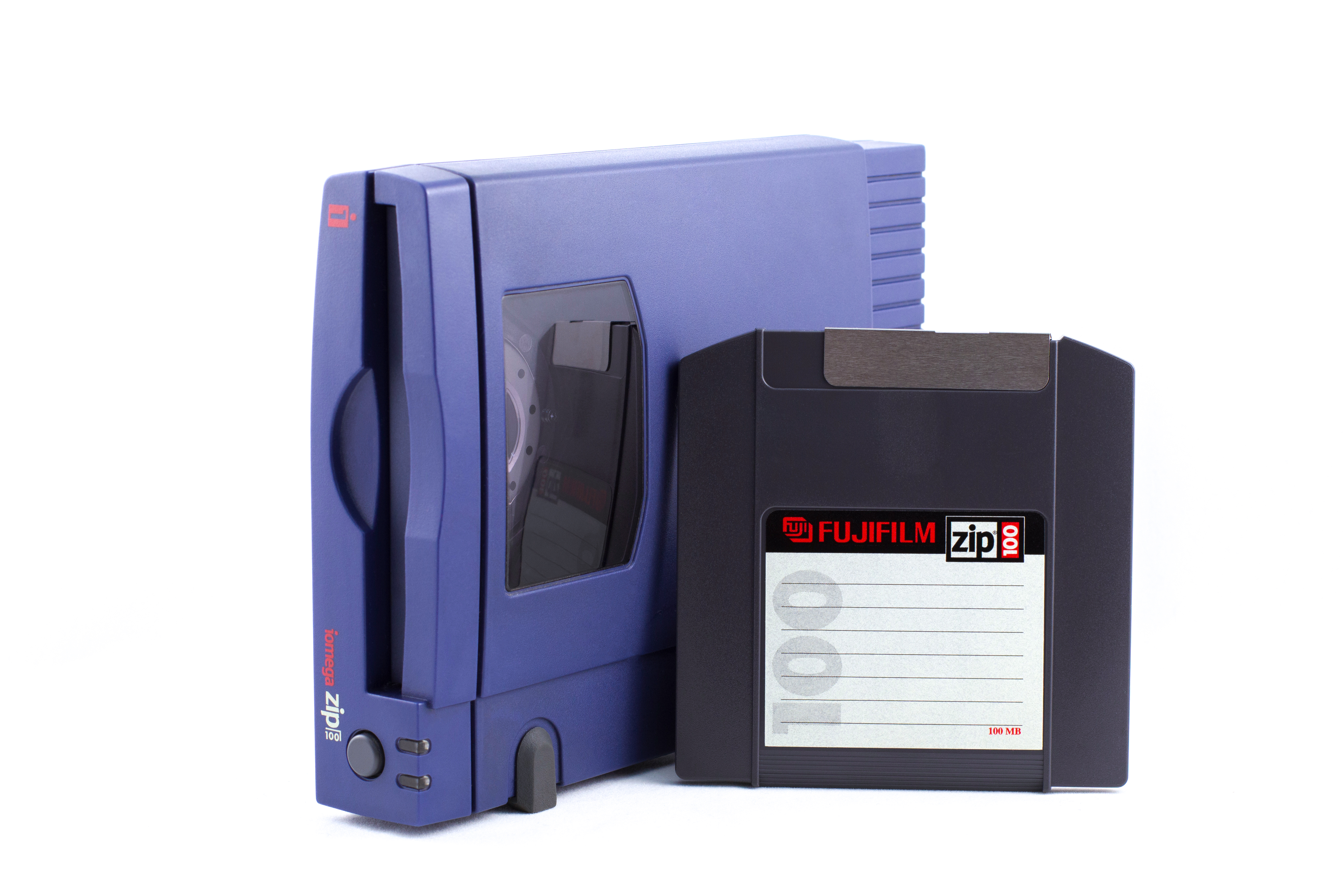
ZIP 100 drive with cartridge

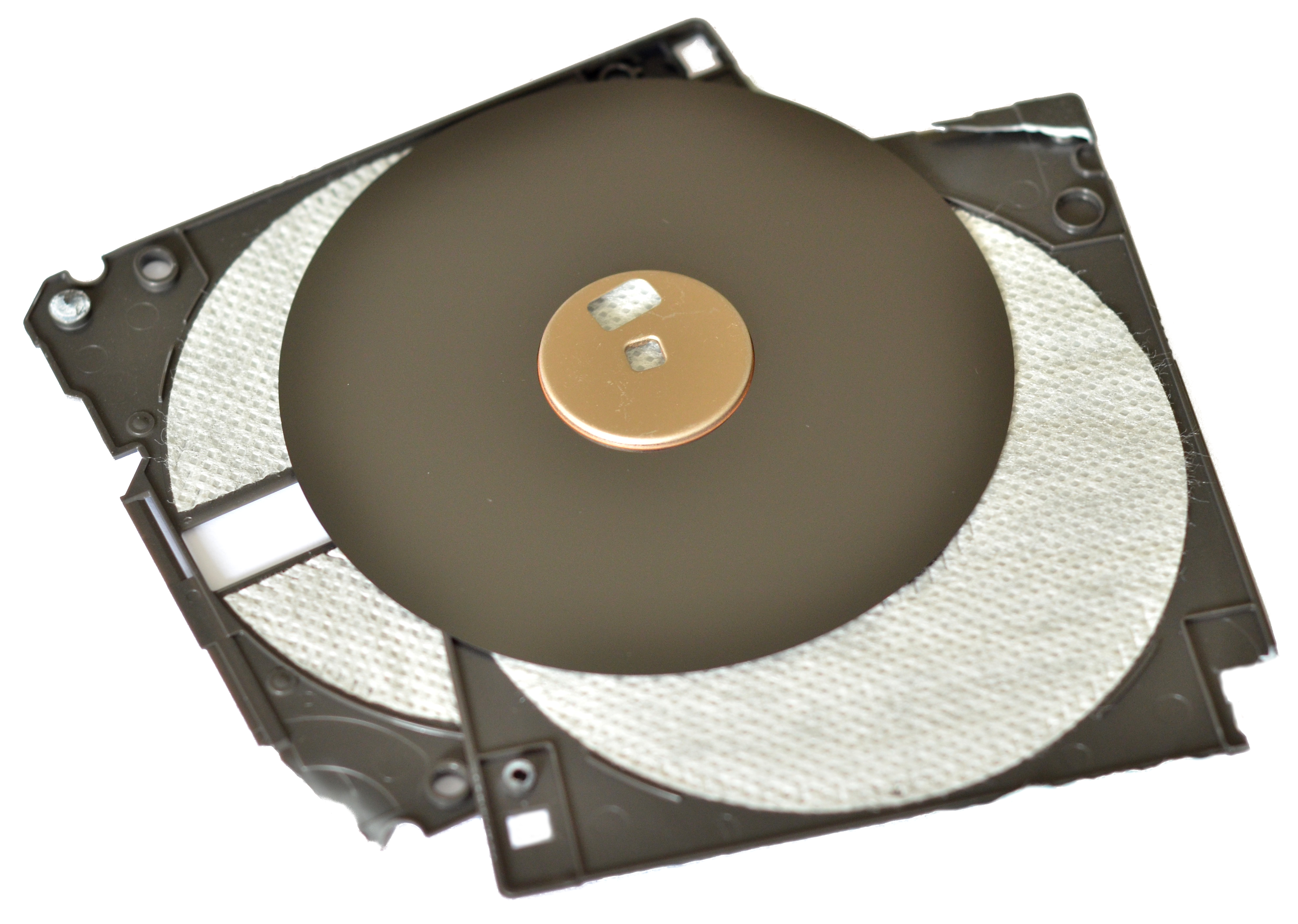
Disassembled LS120 diskette showing structural similarity to low-capacity floppy disks

- Floptical

The Floptical drive can read from and write 720 kB and 1.44 MB 3½-inch disks and uses infra-red LED to position the heads over marks in the disk surface to achieve a capacity of 21 MB on its high-capacity floppy disks. The drives are attached to the system using the SCSI interface instead of the usual floppy controller interface. It is considered to be the first actual super floppy. and its technology was licensed to a number of companies, who introduced compatible devices as well as even larger-capacity formats. The most popular of these, by far, was the LS-120.

- Flextra

The Brier Flextra BR3020 announced at 21.4 MB could read and write 720 KB and 1.44 MB 3½-inch disks.

- Zip disk

Physically both the media and cartridge were slightly larger but similar to other 3½-inch media and cartridges. A linear actuator positioned flying heads over high-capacity media that started at 100 MB and grew to 700 MB. It was offered in a variety of interfaces including PATA.

- LS-120/LS-240

LS, for LASER-servo, uses a LED to generate light that allows the drive to align its heads on high capacity FD media, initially at 120 MB and subsequently at 240 MB. The drive read and write 3½-inch 1,440 KB floppy disks, and some versions of the drive can write 32 MB onto a 3½-inch 1,440 kB disk albeit not too reliably. It was offered in a variety of interfaces including PATA.

- Sony HiFD

Structurally similar to the Floptical and initially at 150 MB, it was removed from the market and subsequently reintroduced at 200 MB

- Caleb UHD144

Structurally similar to the Floptical it provides 144 MB of storage and is capable reading and writing 720 kB and 1.44 MB 3½-inch disks.

=== Variants ===
In addition to the four generations of floppy disks and drives covered in this article there were various other floppy disks (and drives) offered, some were failed attempts to establish a standard for a generation while others were for special applications.

== Operation ==
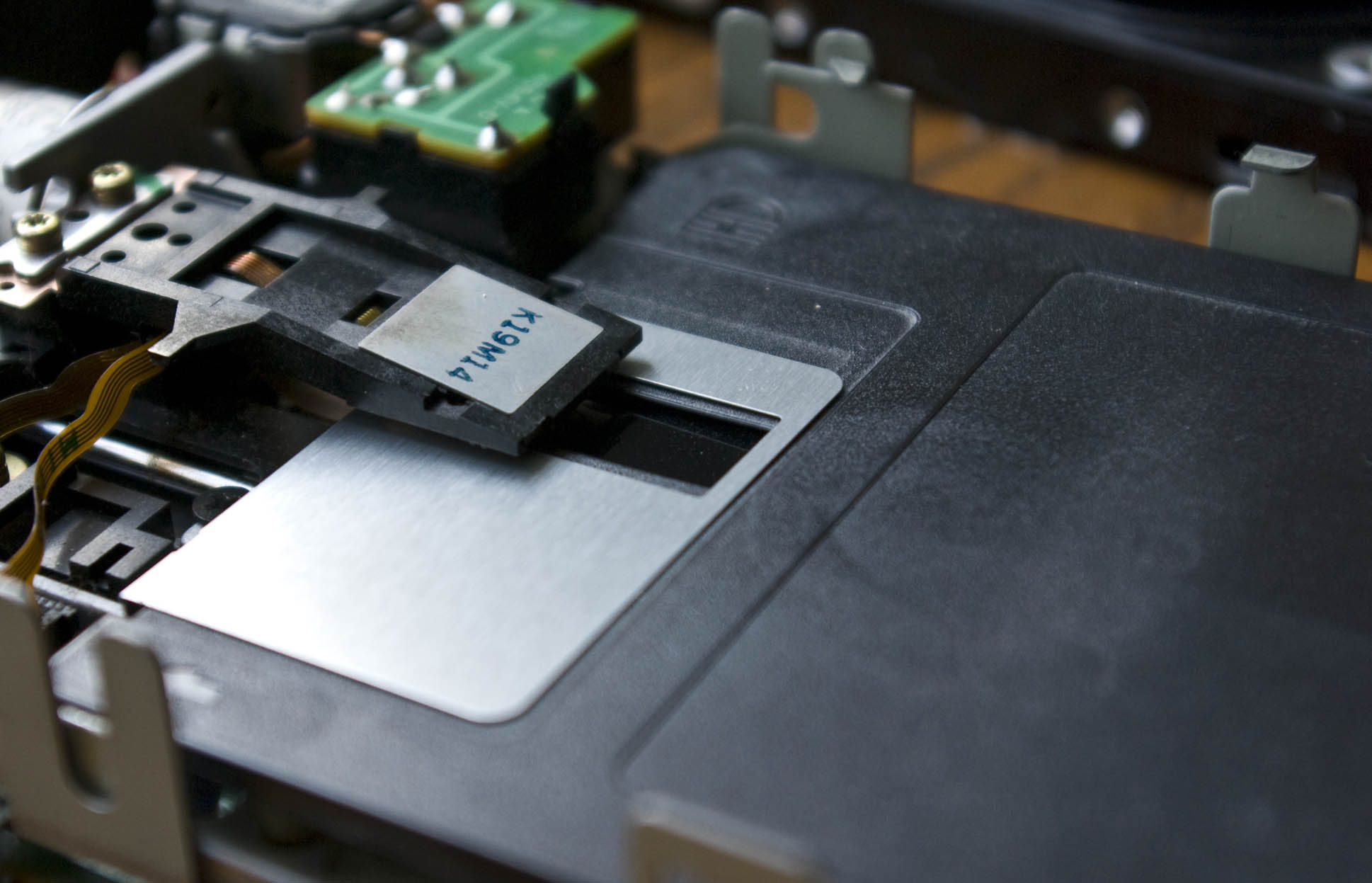
How the read-write head is applied on the floppy

3,5 inch floppy drive noises during a format
00:00–00:03: Starting

00:03–00:15: Normal operation

00:15–00:27: Drive noises while the head passes over bad sectors

A spindle motor in the drive rotates the magnetic medium at a certain speed, while a stepper motor-operated mechanism moves the magnetic read/write heads radially along the surface of the disk. Both read and write operations require the media to be rotating and the head to contact the disk media, an action originally accomplished by a disk-load solenoid. Later drives held the heads out of contact until a front-panel lever was rotated (5¼-inch) or disk insertion was complete (3½-inch). To write data, current is sent through a coil in the head as the media rotates. The head's magnetic field aligns the magnetization of the particles directly below the head on the media. When the current is reversed the magnetization aligns in the opposite direction, encoding one bit of data. To read data, the magnetization of the particles in the media induce a tiny voltage in the head coil as they pass under it. This small signal is amplified and sent to the floppy disk controller, which converts the streams of pulses from the media into data, checks it for errors, and sends it to the host computer system.

=== Formatting ===
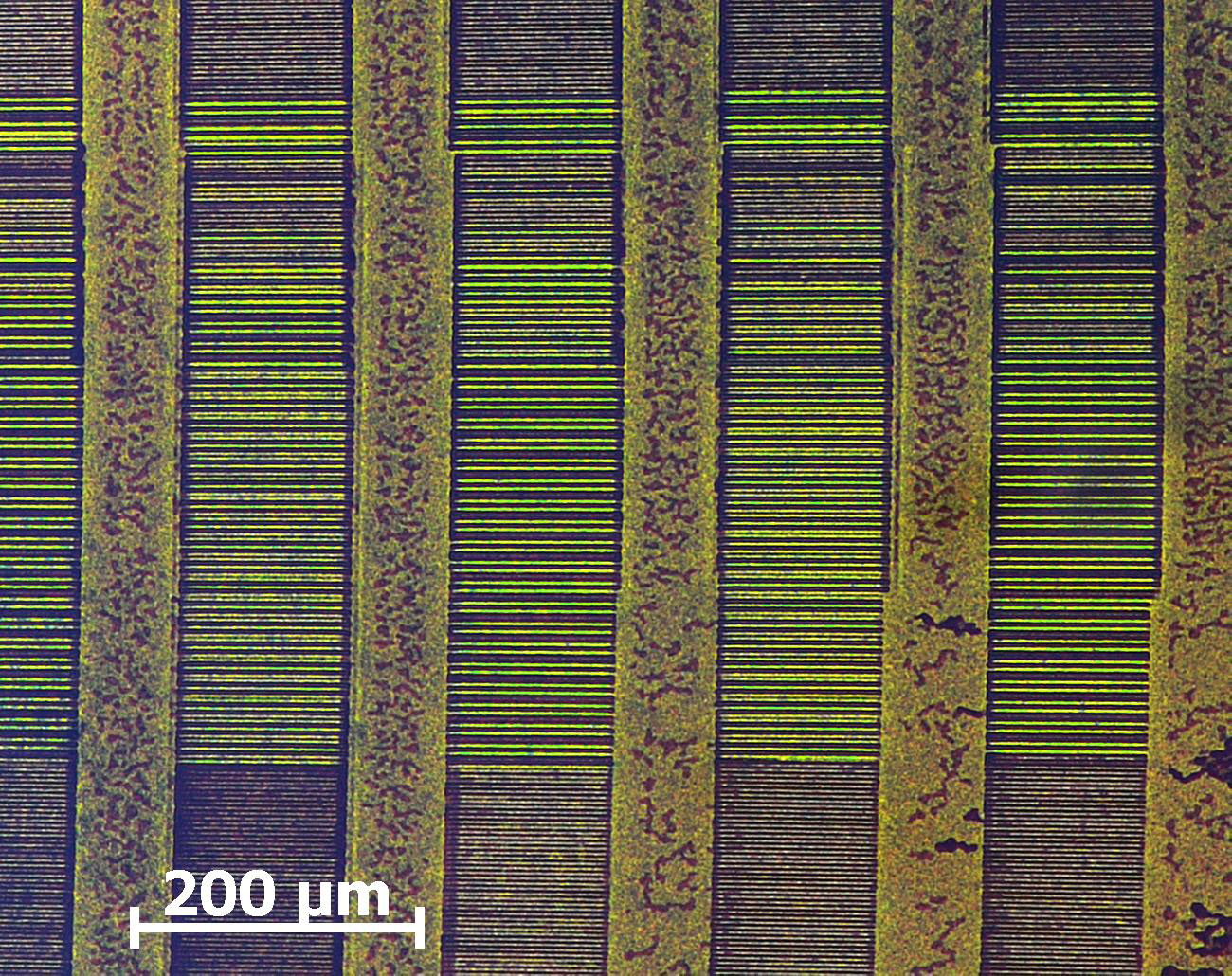
Visualization of magnetic information on floppy disk (image recorded with CMOS-MagView)

A blank unformatted diskette has a coating of magnetic oxide with no magnetic order to the particles. During formatting, the magnetizations of the particles are aligned forming tracks, each broken up into sectors, enabling the controller to properly read and write data. The tracks are concentric rings around the center, with spaces between tracks where no data is written; gaps with padding bytes are provided between the sectors and at the end of the track to allow for slight speed variations in the disk drive, and to permit better interoperability with disk drives connected to other similar systems. Each sector of data has a header that identifies the sector location on the disk. A cyclic redundancy check (CRC) is written into the sector headers and at the end of the user data so that the disk controller can detect potential errors.

Some errors are soft and can be resolved by re-trying the read operation; other errors are permanent and will signal a failure to the operating system if multiple attempts to read the data still fail.

=== Insertion and ejection ===
After a disk is inserted, a catch or lever mechanism engages to prevent the disk from accidentally emerging, engage the spindle clamping hub, and in two-sided drives, engage the second read/write head with the media.

In some 5¼-inch drives, insertion of the disk compresses and locks an ejection spring which partially ejects the disk upon opening the catch or lever. This enables a smaller concave area for the thumb and fingers to grasp the disk during removal.

Newer 5¼-inch drives and all 3½-inch drives automatically engage the spindle and heads when a disk is inserted, doing the opposite with the press of the eject button.

On Macintosh computers with built-in 3½-inch disk drives, the ejection button is replaced by software controlling an ejection motor which only does so when the operating system no longer needs to access the drive. The user could drag the image of the floppy drive to the trash can on the desktop to eject the disk. In the case of a power failure or drive malfunction, a loaded disk can be removed manually by inserting a straightened paper clip into a small hole at the drive's front panel, just as one would do with a CD-ROM drive in a similar situation. The X68000 has soft-eject 5¼-inch drives. Some late-generation IBM PS/2 machines have soft-eject 3½-inch disk drives as well for which PC DOS 5.02 and higher includes an EJECT command.

=== Finding track zero ===
Before a disk can be accessed, the drive needs to synchronize its head position with the disk tracks. In either case, the head is moved so that it is approaching track zero position of the disk. When a drive with the sensor has reached track zero, the head stops moving immediately and is correctly aligned. Drives without a sensor such as the Apple II mechanism attempt to move the head the maximum possible number of positions needed to reach track zero, knowing that once this motion is complete, the head will be positioned over track zero. This physical striking is responsible for the drive "clicking" during boot and whenever track zero synchronization is attempted (usually due to a read error).

=== Finding sectors ===
All 8-inch and some 5¼-inch drives use methods to locate sectors, known as either hard sectors or soft sectors, with the small hole in the jacket, off to the side of the spindle hole, used for timing reference. A light beam sensor detects when a punched hole in the disk is visible through the hole in the jacket. For a soft-sectored disk, there is only a single hole, which is used to locate the first sector of each track. For a hard-sectored disk, there are many holes, one for each sector row, plus an additional hole in a half-sector position, that is used to indicate sector zero.

The Apple II computer system is notable in that it does not have an index-hole sensor and ignores the presence of hard or soft sectoring. Instead, it uses special repeating data synchronization patterns written to the disk between each sector, to assist the computer in finding and synchronizing with the data in each track.

Most 3½-inch drives use a constant speed drive motor and contain the same number of sectors across all tracks. This is sometimes referred to as constant angular velocity. In order to fit more data onto a disk, some 3½-inch drives (notably the Macintosh External 400K and 800K drives) instead use constant linear velocity, which uses a variable-speed drive motor that spins more slowly as the head moves away from the center of the disk, maintaining the same speed of the head(s) relative to the surface(s) of the disk. This allows more sectors to be written to the longer middle and outer tracks as the track length increases.

== Historical sequence of floppy disk formats ==
Floppy disk size is often referred to in inches, even in countries using metric and though the size is defined in metric. The ANSI specification of 3½-inch disks is entitled in part "90 mm (3.5-inch)" though 90 mm is closer to 3.54 inches. Formatted capacities are generally set in terms of kilobytes and megabytes.

Historical sequence of floppy disk formats In quantities of bits (b) or bytes (B) Prefixes: k = 1,000; K = 1,024; M may mean 1,000,000 or 1,048,576 or some other multiple.
Disk format	Year introduced	Formatted storage capacity	Marketed capacity
8-inch: IBM 23FD (read-only)	1971	81.664 kB	Not marketed commercially
8-inch: Memorex 650	1972	175 kB	1.5 megabit full track
8-inch: SS SD; IBM 33FD / Shugart 901	1973	242.844 kB	3.1 megabit unformatted
8-inch: DS SD; IBM 43FD / Shugart 850	1976	568.320 kB	6.2 megabit unformatted
5¼-inch (35 track) Shugart SA 400	1976	87.5 KB	110 kB
8-inch DS DD; IBM 53FD / Shugart 850	1977	962–1,184 KB depending upon sector size	1.2 MB
5¼-inch DD	1978	360 or 800 KB	360 KB
5¼-inch Apple Disk II (Pre-DOS 3.3)	1978	113.75 KB (256 byte sectors, 13 sectors/track, 35 tracks)	113 KB
5¼-inch Atari DOS 2.0S	1979	90 KB (128 byte sectors, 18 sectors/track, 40 tracks)	90 KB
5¼-inch Commodore DOS 1.0 (SSDD)	1979	172.5 KB	170 KB
5¼-inch Commodore DOS 2.1 (SSDD)	1980	170.75 KB	170 KB
5¼-inch Apple Disk II (DOS 3.3)	1980	140 KB (256 byte sectors, 16 sectors/track, 35 tracks)	140 KB
5¼-inch QD	1980	720 KB	720 KB
5¼-inch Victor 9000 / ACT Sirius 1 (SSDD)	1982	612 KB (512 byte sectors, 11–19 variable sectors / track, 80 tracks)	600 KB
5¼-inch Victor 9000 / ACT Sirius 1 (DSDD)	1982	1,196 KB (512 byte sectors, 11–19 variable sectors / track, 80 tracks)	1,200 KB
5¼-inch RX50 (SSQD)	c. 1982	—N/a	400 KB
5¼-inch HD	1982	1,200 KB	1.2 MB
3½-inch HP SS	1982	280 KB (256 byte sectors, 16 sectors/track, 70 tracks)	264 KB
3-inch	1982	?	125 KB (SS/SD), 500 KB (DS/DD)
5¼-inch Apple FileWare "Twiggy" (Lisa 1)	1983	871 KB	871 KB
5¼-inch Atari DOS 3	1983	127 KB (128 byte sectors, 26 sectors/track, 40 tracks)	130 KB
3½-inch SS DD (at release)	1983	360 KB (400 KB on Macintosh)	500 KB
3½-inch DS DD	1983	720 KB (800 KB on Macintosh and RISC OS, 880 KB on Amiga)	1 MB
3-inch Mitsumi Quick Disk	1985	128 to 256 KB	?
3-inch Famicom Disk System (derived from Quick Disk)	1986	112 KB	128 KB
2½-inch Sharp CE-1600F, CE-140F (chassis: FDU-250, medium: CE-1650F)	1986	Turnable diskette with 62,464 bytes per side (512 byte sectors, 8 sectors/track, 16 tracks, GCR (4/5) recording)	2× 64 KB (128 KB)
5¼-inch Perpendicular	1986	100 KB per inch	?
3½-inch HD	1986	1,440 KB (512 bytes sectors, 18 sectors/track, 160 tracks); 1,760 KB on Amiga	1.44 MB (2.0 MB unformatted)
3½-inch HD	1987	1,600 KB on RISC OS	1.6 MB
3½-inch ED	1987	2,880 KB (3,200 KB on Sinclair QL)	2.88 MB
2-inch	1989	720 KB	?
3½-inch Floptical (LS)	1991	20,385 KB	21 MB
3½-inch SuperDisk (LS-120)	1996	120,375 KB	120 MB
3½-inch HiFD	1998/99	?	150/200 MB
3½-inch SuperDisk (LS-240)	2001	240,750 KB	240 MB
Abbreviations: SD = Single Density; DD = Double Density; QD = Quad Density; HD = High Density; ED = Extra-high Density; LS = Laser Servo; HiFD = High capacity Floppy Disk; SS = Single Sided; DS = Double Sided
Formatted storage capacity is total size of all sectors on the disk: For 8-inch see List of floppy disk formats#IBM 8-inch formats. Spare, hidden and otherwise reserved sectors are included in this number.; For 5¼- and 3½-inch capacities quoted are from subsystem or system vendor statements.; Marketed capacity is the capacity, typically unformatted, by the original media OEM vendor or in the case of IBM media, the first OEM thereafter. Other formats may get more or less capacity from the same drives and disks.

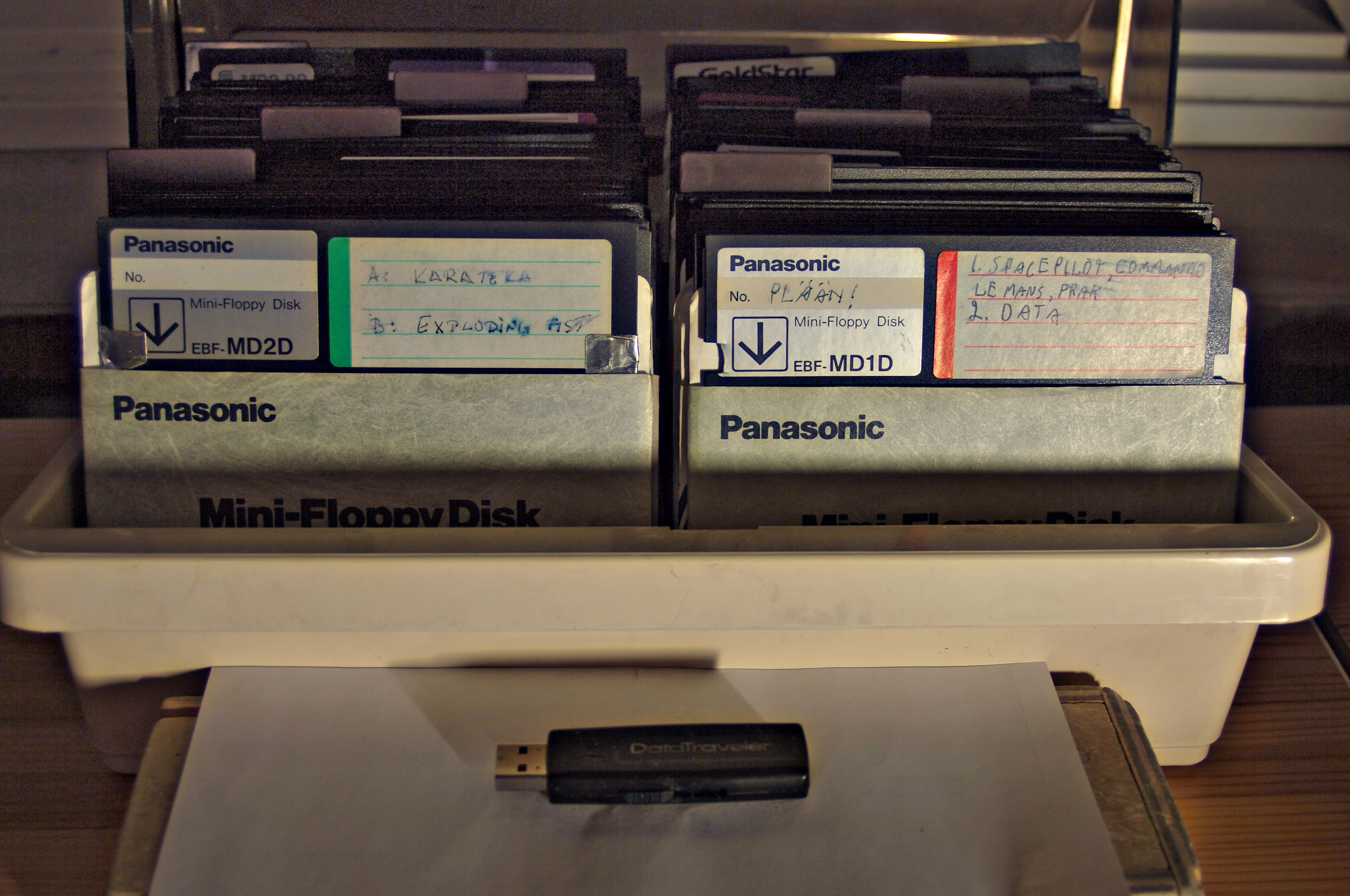
The USB stick under the two boxes of about 80 floppy disks is capable of holding over 130 times as much data as the two boxes of disks put together.

Data is generally written to floppy disks in sectors (angular blocks) and tracks (concentric rings at a constant radius). For example, the HD format of 3½-inch floppy disks uses 512 bytes per sector, 18 sectors per track, 80 tracks per side and two sides, for a total of 1,474,560 bytes per disk. Some disk controllers can vary these parameters at the user's request, increasing storage on the disk, although they may not be able to be read on machines with other controllers. For example, Microsoft applications were often distributed on 3½-inch 1.68 MB DMF disks formatted with 21 sectors instead of 18; they could still be recognized by a standard controller. Constant linear velocity was generally not used on floppy disks, so most computer systems used constant angular velocity (CAV) format, with the disk spinning at a constant speed and the sectors holding the same amount of information on each track regardless of radial location. A notable exception was Apple, which implemented CLV in early Macintosh computers by spinning the disk more slowly when the head was at the edge, while maintaining the data rate, allowing 400 KB of storage per side and an extra 80 KB on a double-sided disk.

Because the sectors have constant angular size, the 512 bytes in each sector are compressed more near the disk's center. A more space-efficient technique would be to increase the number of sectors per track toward the outer edge of the disk, from 18 to 30 for instance, thereby keeping nearly constant the amount of physical disk space used for storing each sector; an example is zone bit recording. Apple implemented this in early Macintosh computers by spinning the disk more slowly when the head was at the edge, while maintaining the data rate, allowing 400 KB of storage per side and an extra 80 KB on a double-sided disk. This higher capacity came with a disadvantage: the format used a unique drive mechanism and control circuitry, meaning that Mac disks could not be read on other computers. Apple eventually reverted to constant angular velocity on HD floppy disks with their later machines, still unique to Apple as they supported the older variable-speed formats.

Disk formatting is usually done by a utility program supplied by the computer OS manufacturer; generally, it sets up a file storage directory system on the disk, and initializes its sectors and tracks. Areas of the disk unusable for storage due to flaws can be locked (marked as "bad sectors") so that the operating system does not attempt to use them. This was time-consuming so many environments had quick formatting which skipped the error checking process. When floppy disks were often used, disks pre-formatted for popular computers were sold. The unformatted capacity of a floppy disk does not include the sector and track headings of a formatted disk; the difference in storage between them depends on the drive's application. Floppy disk drive and media manufacturers specify the unformatted capacity (for example, 2 MB for a standard 3½-inch HD floppy). It is implied that this should not be exceeded, since doing so will most likely result in performance problems. DMF was introduced permitting 1.68 MB to fit onto an otherwise standard 3½-inch disk; utilities then appeared allowing disks to be formatted as such.

Mixtures of decimal prefixes and binary sector sizes require care to properly calculate total capacity. For example, 1.44 MB 3½-inch HD disks have the "M" prefix peculiar to their context, coming from their capacity of 2,880 512-byte sectors (1,440 KiB), consistent with neither a decimal megabyte nor a binary mebibyte (MiB). Hence, these disks hold 1.47 MB or 1.41 MiB. Usable data capacity is a function of the disk format used, which in turn is determined by the FDD controller and its settings. Differences between such formats can result in capacities ranging from approximately 1,300 to 1,760 KiB (1.80 MB) on a standard 3½-inch high-density floppy (and up to nearly 2 MB with utilities such as 2M/2MGUI). The highest capacity techniques require much tighter matching of drive head geometry between drives, something not always possible and unreliable. For example, the LS-240 drive supports a 32 MB capacity on standard 3½-inch HD disks, but this is a write-once technique, and requires its own drive.

The raw maximum transfer rate of 3½-inch ED floppy drives (2.88 MB) is nominally 1,000 kilobits/s, or approximately 83% that of single-speed CD-ROM (71% of audio CD). This represents the speed of raw data bits moving under the read head; however, the effective speed is somewhat less due to space used for headers, gaps and other format fields and can be even further reduced by delays to seek between tracks.

== Adoption and usage ==
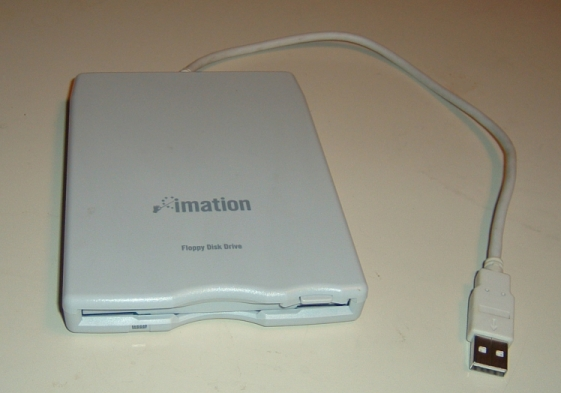
Imation USB floppy drive, model 01946: an external drive that accepts high-density disks

Floppy disks became commonplace during the 1980s and 1990s in their use with personal computers to distribute software, transfer data, and create backups. Before hard disks became affordable to the general population, floppy disks were often used to store a computer's operating system (OS). Most home computers from that time have an elementary OS and BASIC stored in read-only memory (ROM), with the option of loading a more advanced OS from a floppy disk.

By the early 1990s, the increasing software size meant large packages like Windows or Adobe Photoshop required a dozen disks or more. In 1996, there were an estimated five billion standard floppy disks in use.

An attempt to enhance the existing 3½-inch designs was the SuperDisk in the late 1990s, using very narrow data tracks and a high precision head guidance mechanism with a capacity of 120 MB and backward-compatibility with standard 3½-inch floppies; a format war briefly occurred between SuperDisk and other high-density floppy-disk products, although ultimately recordable CDs/DVDs, solid-state flash storage, and eventually cloud-based online storage would render all these removable disk formats obsolete. External USB-based floppy disk drives are still available, and many modern systems provide firmware support for booting from such drives.

== Legacy ==
Screenshot depicting a floppy disk as "save" icon

For more than two decades, the floppy disk was the primary external writable storage device used. Most small computing environments before the 1990s were non-networked, and floppy disks were the primary means to transfer data between such computers, a method known informally as sneakernet. Unlike hard disks, floppy disks were more commonly handled and seen, and typically novice users could identify a floppy disk. Because of these factors, a picture of a 3½-inch floppy disk became an interface metaphor for saving data. As of 2026, the floppy disk symbol is still used by software on user-interface elements related to saving files even though physical floppy disks are largely obsolete, making it a skeuomorph. Examples of such software include LibreOffice, Microsoft Paint, and WordPad.

It is present in many UI symbol libraries and has a Unicode code point 💾 since 2010.

== See also ==
- Berg connector – Brand of electrical connector used in computer hardware
- dd (Unix) – Shell command for copying and converting file data
- Disk image – Computer file with a storage device's contents
- IBM Extended Density Format
- Shugart bus – Computer storage bus
- VGA-Copy – MS-DOS software to copy floppy disks
- Write precompensation
- X10 accelerated floppy drive – Floppy disk drive
