= 1978 in games =

This page lists board and card games, wargames, miniatures games, and tabletop role-playing games published in 1978. For video games, see 1978 in video gaming.

== Games released or invented in 1978 ==
- Adventures in Fantasy
- Battle-Sphere
- Black Hole
- (This Game is) Bonkers!
- The Campaign for North Africa
- Cyborg
- Dawn of the Dead
- Empire
- Gamma World (tabletop role-playing game)
- G.E.V.
- High Fantasy
- Ice War
- It
- John Carter, Warlord of Mars (role-playing game)
- Junta
- King Arthur's Knights
- Magic Realm
- Mayday
- The Next War
- Olympica
- Pente
- Privateer
- Quad-Ominos
- Quest
- RuneQuest (tabletop role-playing game)
- The Sorcerer's Cave
- Spellmaker
- Star Fighter
- Star Trek: Adventure Gaming in the Final Frontier (tabletop role-playing game)
- Starfleet Wars (Superior Models, Inc.)
- Starships & Spacemen
- Stomp!
- Strike Team Alpha
- Strange New Worlds
- Swords & Sorcery
- To the Green Fields Beyond
- War in the Ice
- Wizard

== See also ==
- 1978 in video gaming
