= IT2 =

IT2 may refer to:

- It Takes Two (Australian TV series), 2000s musical talent show
- Information systems technician (United States Navy) second class (IT2), a type of petty officer second class in the United States Navy
- International tolerance grade 2 (IT2), an IT Grade on linear dimensions in engineering
- IT2, Barangaroo South, Barangaroo, New South Wales, Australia

== See also ==
- IT (disambiguation)
- ITT (disambiguation)
- I^{2}T
- LT2
