= ITT =

ITT may refer to:

== Communication ==
- Infantry tank telephone, a device allowing infantrymen to speak to the occupants of armoured vehicles.

== Mathematics ==
- Intuitionistic type theory, other name of Martin-Löf Type Theory
- Intensional type theory

== Business ==
- ITT Inc. (formerly International Telephone & Telegraph), US
- Invitation to tender for a contract
- ITT Semiconductors

== Education ==
- ITT Technical Institute, US
- Former Institute of Technology, Tallaght, Dublin, Ireland
- Institute of Technology, Tralee, Ireland

== Media ==
- Cousin Itt, of the fictional Addams Family
- "I.T.T (International Thief Thief)", a political screed about ITT Corp. by Fela Kuti

== Medicine ==
- Insulin tolerance test
- Intention to treat analysis in medicine
- Intermittent testicular torsion

== Sport ==
- Individual time trial in bicycle racing

== See also ==
- IT (disambiguation)
- IT2 (disambiguation)
- I^{2}T
- lTT (disambiguation)
