= UHD =

UHD may refer to:

== Technology ==
- Ultra-high-definition television
- Ultra HD, any of several high-definition graphics display resolutions
- USRP hardware driver, used with Universal Software Radio Peripherals
- Ultra HD Blu-ray, an enhanced variant of Blu-ray
- Intel UHD Graphics

== Other uses ==
- Universal HD, an American television network
- University of Houston–Downtown
- University Hospitals Dorset NHS Foundation Trust, an NHS trust located in the south of England

== See also ==
- Caleb UHD144, a floppy disk system
