= Dungeon Floors =

Supplement for tabletop role-playing games

Dungeon Floors is a fantasy role-playing game supplement published by Heritage USA in 1981.

== Contents ==
Dungeon Floors is a set of full color cards intended to be cut up and used for surfaces such as wood and stone floors and stairways for gaming miniatures. Dungeon Floors was composed of a set of nine cardboard sheets which could be used to create tiles that could be arranged to represent different layouts for role-playing spaces, such as building interiors, caverns, underground passages.

There was also an instruction folder describing how to use the tiles and how to integrate the marked spaces on them with common RPG rulesets. The spaces were sized to take 25mm miniatures, such as those made by Heritage and most other companies at the time.

== Editions ==
There were three editions of Dungeon Floors. The first was a shrink-wrapped group of thin card pieces printed with black ink only. The second edition was printed in two-color format (black ink and brown ink). The third edition was boxed, and printed in full-color with detailed realistic artwork.

The first two editions were part of Heritage's Dungeon Builders line of products, which featured molded 3-D walls with stone and other textures. The third and best-selling edition of Dungeon Floors was a standalone product, the Dungeon Builders line having been discontinued by that time.

== Reception ==
Steve Jackson reviewed Dungeon Floors in The Space Gamer No. 49. Jackson commented that "if you like such things, Dungeon Floors ought to please you greatly."
