= Stomp =

Stomp may refer to:

- Stomp (strike), a downwards kick using the heel

== Music and dance ==
- Stomp (album), by Big D and the Kids Table, 2013
- Stomp (jazz), a type of rhythmic jazz tune popular in the 1920s
- Stomp (theatrical show), a percussive physical theatre troupe
- Stomp dance, a Native American dance
- Stomp Records, a record label now part of Union Label Group

=== Songs ===
- "Stomp!" (Brothers Johnson song)
- "Stomp" (God's Property song)
- "Stomp" (Steps song)
- "Stomp", a song by Young Buck from Straight Outta Cashville
- "Stomp", a song by Wilson Pickett
- Stompa (song), a song by Serena Ryder

== Other uses ==
- Stomp!, a board wargame
- STOMP (formerly Straits Times Online Media Print), a Singaporean citizen journalism website
- Streaming Text Oriented Messaging Protocol, a protocol for working with message-oriented middleware
- WWF S.T.O.M.P., a line of Jakks action figures based on WWE (formerly WWF) wrestlers

== See also ==
- Stomping, a musical technique
