= Floptical =

Type of floppy disk drive

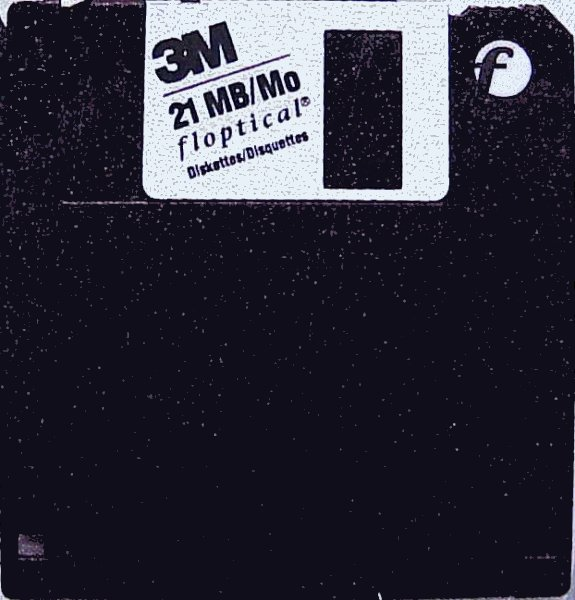
The 21 MB Floptical 3 1/2-inch disk

Floptical refers to a type of floppy disk drive that combines magnetic and optical technologies to store data on media similar to standard 3 1/2-inch floppy disks. The name is a portmanteau of the words "floppy" and "optical". It refers specifically to one brand of drive and disk system, but is also used more generically to refer to any system using similar techniques.

The original Floptical technology was announced in 1988 and introduced late in 1991 by Insite Peripherals, a venture funded company set up by Jim Adkisson, one of the key engineers behind the original 5 1/4-inch floppy disk drive development at Shugart Associates in 1976. The main shareholders were Maxell, Iomega and 3M. This original format normally held 21 MB of data, compared to the contemporary 3.5" floppy capacity of 720 kB or 1.44 MB.

Over the next several years, similar products were introduced by other companies with ever increasing capacity, eventually reaching 240 MB in some systems. All of these, along with competing systems like the Zip drive, were replaced by writable CD-ROMs in many roles, and later, by thumb drives which were cheaper, simpler, smaller, and faster.

== Technical aspects ==
Technical specifications
Unformatted	25 MB
Formatted	20385 KB
Rotational speed	720 rpm
Track density	1250 TPI
Recording density	23980 bpi (RLL)
Transfer from disk	1.6 Mb/s
Buffer transfer rate	2 MB/s
Average seek time	65 ms
Settle time	15 ms
Motor start time	750 ms
Number of heads	2
Cylinders	755
Sectors per track	27
Sector size (set at format time)	256, 512, or 1024 bytes
Interface	SCSI

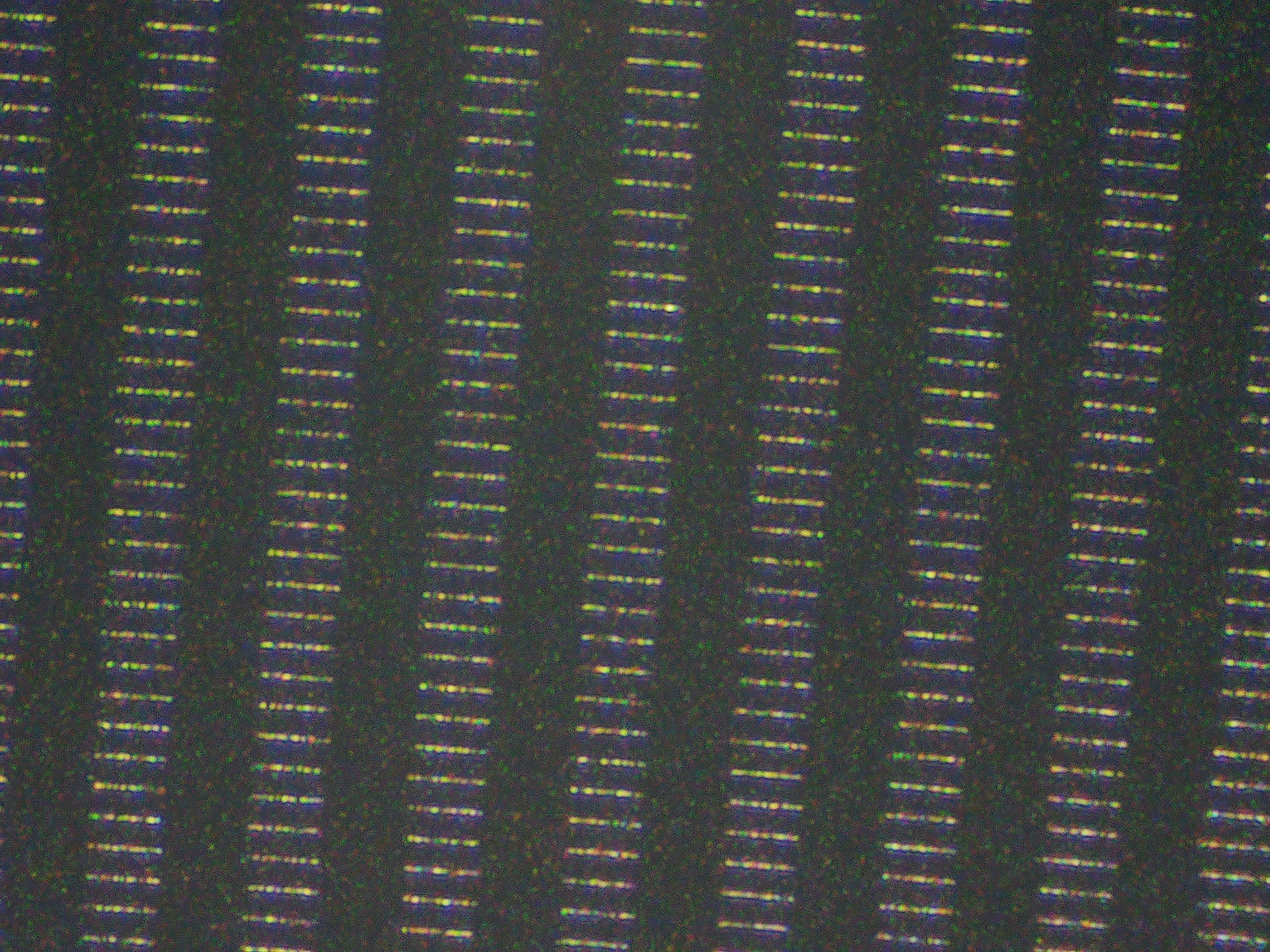
Optical alignment tracks visible on an LS-120 SuperDisk (200× magnification)

The technology involves reading and writing data magnetically, while optically aligning the read/write head in the drive using grooves in the disk being sensed by an infrared LED and sensor (a form of visual servo). The magnetic head touches the recording surface, as it does in a normal floppy drive. The optical servo tracks allow for an increase in the tracking precision of the magnetic head, from the usual 135 tracks per inch to 1250 tracks per inch. Floptical disks provide 21 MB of storage. The drive has a second set of read/write heads so that it can read from and write to standard 720 KB and 1.44 MB (1440 KB) disks as well.

To allow for a high degree of compatibility with existing SCSI host adapters, Floptical drives were designed to work as a standard floppy disk drive, and not as a removable hard disk. To ensure this, a "write lockout" feature was added in the firmware, effectively inhibiting writing (including any kind of formatting) of the media. It is possible to unlock the drive by issuing a SCSI Mode Sense Command, and Insite also issued EPROMs where this feature was not present.

At least two models were produced, one with a manual lever that mechanically ejected the disc from the drive, and another with a small pinhole into which a paperclip can be inserted, in case the device rejected or ignored SCSI eject commands.

== Market performance ==
Insite licensed the floptical technology to a number of companies, including Matsushita, Iomega, Maxell/Hitachi and others. A number of these companies later formed the Floptical Technology Association, or FTA, to try to have the format adopted as a replacement of standard floppy disks.

Around 70,000 Insite Flopticals are believed to have been sold worldwide in the product's lifetime. Silicon Graphics used them in their SGI Indigo and SGI Indy series of computer workstations. It was also reported that Commodore International had selected the Insite Floptical for its Amiga 3000. However, this did not take place, and while Flopticals were installed in many Amiga systems, they were sold by either Insite, TTR Development or Digital Micronics (DMI), and not bundled by Commodore.

Iomega licensed the Floptical technology as early as 1989 and produced a compatible drive known as the Insider.

A few years later, a number of other companies introduced Floptical-like but incompatible systems:

Iomega introduced their own ZIP-100 system storing 100 MB in 1994, which would go on to sell into the tens of millions. Later versions would increase the capacity to 250 and 750 MB. These had the disadvantage of not being able to read or write normal floppies, which generally required a second drive to be available.

Another similar system was Imation's LS‑120 SuperDisk in 1996. The LS-120 stored 120 MB of data while retaining the ability to work with normal 3 1/2-inch disks, interfacing as a standard floppy for better compatibility. A later LS-240 version would store up to 240 MB.

A smaller competitor was the almost unknown Caleb UHD144 in 1997. Their primary advantage was the low cost of their disks.

Since 1998, Sony also tried their own Floptical-based format, the Sony HiFD, but quality control problems ruined its reputation. The first version could store 150 MB, but it was soon replaced by a 200 MB version.

There was serious consideration that one of these systems would succeed where the Floptical failed and replace the standard floppy disk outright, but the rapid introduction of writable CD-ROM systems in the early 2000s made the market disappear.

== Operating system support ==
Support of Floptical drives is present in all Microsoft Windows NT operating systems up to Windows 2000, where it figures as 20.8 MB drive format option in the FORMAT command options. The FORMAT command in Windows XP and newer lacks support of the Floptical drive. Floptical support exists in SCO OpenServer as well. SCSI-equipped Macintosh computers could boot from a Mac operating system installed on a Floptical; a formatting utility application was provided to erase and format Floptical disks. Likewise, Silicon Graphics' IRIX operating system included Floptical support.

== See also ==
- Magneto-optical drive
- SuperDisk (LS-120)
- Zip drive
