= Strange World =

Strange World(s) may refer to:

== Books ==
- Strange Worlds (Avon Comics), a 1950–1955 U.S. science fiction anthology comic book series
- Strange Worlds (Atlas Comics), a 1958–1959 U.S. science fiction anthology comic book series
- Strange Worlds (Ralph Milne Farley collection), a 1953 book anthology of science fiction stories by Ralph Milne Farley
- Strange World, a 1964 book by Frank Edwards

== Film and TV ==
- Strange World (TV series) a 1999 U.S. TV show
- Strange World (film), a 2022 Disney animated film
- "Strange Worlds" (Solar System), a 2024 television episode

== Music ==
- Strange World (soundtrack), the soundtrack album to the 2022 Disney film
- Strange World, a 2022 EP by Ha Sung-woon
- "Strange World" (song), a 1995 song by Ké
- "Strange World", a 1980 song by Iron Maiden from their debut album Iron Maiden
- "Strange World", a 2000 single by Mike Dierickx, recording as Push
- "Strange World", a 2003 electronica song by The Eternals from their debut album Astropioneers
- "Strange World", a 2005 song by Gamma Ray from their album Majestic
- "Strange World", a 2012 song by the Beach Boys from their album That's Why God Made the Radio

== See also ==
- Strange New World (disambiguation)
- Strange Free World, 1991 album by Kitchens of Distinction
- World Gone Strange, 1991 album by Andy Summers
- Strange Is This World, 1972 album by Niemen
