= It! =

It! may refer to:

- It! (1967 film), a 1966 horror film directed by Herbert J. Leder
- It! The Terror from Beyond Space, a 1958 science fiction film directed by Edward L. Cahn
- "It!" (short story), a story featuring the earliest plant-based swamp monster in literature

== See also ==
- It (disambiguation)
- IT (disambiguation)
