= Starfleet Voyages =

Tabletop role-playing game

- Cover
- Designers: Michael Scott
- Publishers: Terra Games Company
- Publication: 1982
- Genres: Science fiction (Star Trek)
- Systems: Custom

Starfleet Voyages is a science-fiction adventure role-playing game of planetary exploration based on the Star Trek television series.

The game was written by Michael Scott and published by Terra Games Company in 1982 after Heritage USA (who sold an earlier Star Trek RPG) ceased operations. The game was sold in a 1" thick box containing an 8 1/2" × 11" 74-page typewriter-set rulesbook (with errata sheets), character and spaceship data/record sheets, two 8 1/2" × 11" light cardstock template sheets for a starship combat game, and dice.

== Setting ==
Starfleet Voyages was principally set on unexplored planets within the United Federation of Planets. Most player characters were assumed to be members of Star Fleet engaged in planetary exploration missions. They typically held senior posts on a starship bridge and visited alien planets as part of landing parties.

For the most part, the game's rules were set in the original TV series era (a.d. 2260s) and Star Trek: The Animated Series TV series. Starfleet Voyages was an effort to capitalize on the renewed interest in Star Trek adventure gaming that's followed Star Trek II: Wrath of Khan, while avoiding the high licensing fees associated with any "official" Star Trek game.

=== Core Rules ===
The core rules were a revised version of the earlier Heritage Star Trek RPG (Star Trek: Adventure Gaming in the Final Frontier), with extra material on skills, Star Fleet organization, ranks and uniforms, plus updates from the two movies, but with specific character references omitted to produce a generic design that included terms like "Vulcan Science Officer", "Klingon Soldier", but left in Trek-specific terms like Phaser and Warp Drive (though the Klingon, Romulan and Kzinti sample characters retained their original names). The section on starflight seemed to be a modification of Gamescience's Star Fleet Battle Manual with some adaptations from Gamescience's Star Patrol for system and planetary data generation.

The rulesbook contained two rules sets; the adventures for individuals were covered in the adventure game rules called "The Landing Party," and the starship conflict rules were explained in the "Starflight" section. "The Landing Party" contains rules for adventures by the starship crew who have left the spaceship to explore the surface of an unexplored and usually primitive planet. There were two phases to "The Landing Party," called the Basic and Advanced games.

=== The Basic Game ===
The Basic Game covers the mechanics of individual player Character Generation, Learning which means coming to understand new phenomena as they were presented by the Mission Master (Starfleet Voyages terminology for the GM), Psionics, Saving Rolls, the Transporter, Combat Rules, Movement, Hand-to-Hand and Ranged combat, Recordkeeping, and a simplified characteristic system for generating NPC monster stats. The section concludes with a basic equipment list and a scenario intended to be used with a set of pre-generated characters. These include the captain of a starship, his fellow bridge officers, and other crew members who have crash-landed their shuttle on a mysterious planet. They must devise a means of repairing their ship to take off again and rejoin their spaceship.

=== The Advanced Game ===
The Advanced Game began with another scenario which has the intrepid crew members and officers investigate an ancient base of the long-gone Slaver Empire. Unbeknownst to them the base is also being explored by a crew of hostile contemporary aliens. The scenario was followed by the supporting advanced rules, which begin with character generation rules for rolling up Federation Starfleet crew characters.

When generating a character a player rolls 3D6 for Strength, Dexterity, Luck, Mentality, Charisma, and Constitution. Size equals a height of 175 cm modified by the roll of a D4 and a D10. Finally Movement was equal to 10m, modified up or down by Size, Strength, and the encumbrance of any equipment carried. Individual combat in this game revolves around the modified roll of a six-sided die. In hand-to-hand fighting, each combatant rolls D6, adding or subtracting from the roll a number based on personal characteristics and combat skill to hit the enemy, who in turn rolls a similarly modified D6 in defense. Damage was equal to the remainder of the attack roll minus the defense roll, if it was positive. Ranged weapon combat was similar, with the attacker rolling a number based on dexterity to hit, and the defender rolling to dodge the shot.

Some non-human races and 1% of all humans and aliens have powers, which were treated in expanded detail. A given player-character, if psionic at all, might have one power, such as telepathy, recognition, or mind control.

The next section listed Familiar Lifeforms: composed of intelligent species with many of them dangerous and hostile. The list concluded with a set of randomly entered tables for the creation of new monsters with which to entertain the players.

Next the equipment listing contained variations on the devices already noted in the basic rules equipment section. There were many weapons, some protective devices, and a few gadgets such as belt lights, chronometers, and advanced tricorders.

Starfleet life was described mostly in terms of division and ranks. The fleet is divided into Command, Sciences, and Services divisions - a character is usually assigned to one of these when a character rolls to find the starting rank for a new character. This rank may be anywhere from Technician III to Captain. Characters may have specific skills in the operation of a starship - there were 21 skills, ranging from military weaponry to operation of naval technical equipment. In a campaign, characters may study to improve existing skills or gain more advanced ones.

Finally, "The Landing Party" concluded with a more complete combat system that included many possible situational modifiers and an extensive weapons effects list. There was also a list of possible sources for further scenarios, and a bibliography of then-existing Star Trek-related book titles.

=== Star Ship Rules ===
"Starflight" was a simple game of starship conflict. Since the "Landing Party" characters must travel to strange planets to have adventures, and since travel (not to mention many of the adventures) involve contact with potentially hostile nonhuman groups, these rules were a necessary part of the campaign. The gamemaster was expected to generate a random star-map on graph paper, using three-dimensional coordinates. Given the map, the distances between all the different systems were calculated by the application of the Pythagorean Theorem, the type of star and number of planets and their type was rolled or assigned, and one star was assigned as an advanced base for the exploring Federation ships.

Conflict occurred when the Federation's ships met those of a hostile non-human race. Each starfaring race may use only certain specific ship designs, and these were rated for power, speed capability, defensive screens, and weapons. The ship player must allocate the output of the ship's power source to those ship functions deemed most useful at the given moment. There is usually not enough power to move at top speed with full defensive screens while shooting every weapon on board. When warships shoot weapons, the players roll percentile dice and modify the results to determine damage. Damage varies with the type of weapon involved, and is assigned to specific systems on the target spaceships. There was no way for individual characters, no matter how well skilled, to influence the performance of their starship in a space battle.

== Reception ==
William A. Barton reviewed Starfleet Voyages in The Space Gamer No. 63. Barton commented that "If you own the Heritage Star Trek rules, Star Patrol, and the SFBA, I see no reason to waste [the money] on the couple of pages of new material in Starfleet Voyages. Even if you don't have all or any of the three, unless you just have to have every Star Trek-related game in print, I'd still recommended passing on this one and going the extra amount for the FASA Star Trek game."

Anders Swenson reviewed Starfleet Voyages for Different Worlds magazine and stated that "I did not find the rules particularly satisfying. I like my adventures set in a broader civilized context than the space navy, and I would certainly find the prospect of an endless series of planetary exploration scenarios to be dull. I also feel that the game mechanics are much too specialized toward combat and weapons use. There are many other science fiction games on the market that do a better job."

== Reading List ==
Beattie, Robert. “The Courier: America’s foremost Miniature Wargaming Magazine Presents ‘A Timeline of the Historical Miniatures Wargaming Hobby.’” The Courier <http://www-personal.umich.edu/~beattie/timeline2.html>.

Crabaugh, Paul Montgomery. Reviews. “Star Trek: Beyond the Final Frontier.” Different Worlds: Magazine of Adventure Role-Playing Games, January 1982. 10-16.

GAMA. Game Manufacturers Association. “2005 Academy Hall of Fame Game Professional: Duke Seifried.” 2 July 2005 <https://web.archive.org/web/20051212091507/http://www.gama.org/news2/2005-hall-of-fame-inductees-announced-2-july-2005>.

Kim, John H. An Encyclopedia of Role-playing Games. <http://www.darkshire.net/~jhkim/rpg/encyclopedia/index.html>.

Milestone, Emmet F. “Kirk on Karit 2: A Star Trek Scenario Report.” Different Worlds: Magazine of Adventure Role-Playing Games, January 1982. 9-11.

White, Damon. “A close look at licensed RPGs and the companies who create them.” Licensed to Produce. GamingReport.com. Posted 2003-08-21 21:03:53 <http://www.gamingreport.com/article.php?sid=9805>.
