= Starfighter =

Starfighter, star fighter or starfighters may refer to:

== Film ==
- The Last Starfighter, a 1984 science fiction film
- The Starfighters, a 1964 film about F-104 pilots
- Starfighter: Sie wollten den Himmel erobern, a 2015 German film about the investigation of F-104's accidents in mid 1960s in West Germany
- Star Wars: Starfighter (film), an upcoming Star Wars film starring Ryan Gosling set for release in 2027

== Games ==
- Star Fighter (board game), 1978
- Starfighter (video game), 1979
- Star Fighter (video game), 1994
- Star Wars: Starfighter (game), 2001

== Vehicles and transportation ==
- Lockheed F-104 Starfighter, a combat aircraft of the U.S. Air Force
  - Canadair CF-104 Starfighter, a variant of the Lockheed F-104
- Starfighters Inc, a civilian organization that flies F-104 Starfighters
- VF-33 "Starfighters", a disestablished US Navy fighter squadron
- MV Star Fighter

=== Fictional ===
- A fighter spacecraft in science fiction
  - List of Star Wars starfighters
    - X-wing starfighter

== Other uses ==
- Starfighters (band), a musical group
- Sailor Star Fighter, a character in Sailor Moon

== See also ==
- Fighter (disambiguation)
- Star (disambiguation)
