= Izzue =

Fashion brand

Izzue (pronounce "issue") is a Chinese fashion brand part of the Hong Kong fashion conglomerate I.T.

== History ==
Izzue was launched in the late 1990s by Sham Kar-wai, founder of I.T. conglomerate. His goal was to bring British fashion to the domestic market.

In 2009, Izzue started an international expansion with store openings in Paris, Canada and London.

In March 2019, Izzue was part of the official schedule of the London Fashion Week, the first time a Hong Kong brand hosted a solo show during the event. Its goal was to become the Chinese equivalent of Uniqlo, Zara or H&M.

== Activities ==
Stores are scattered across Asia including Hong Kong, People's Republic of China, Thailand, Malaysia, Macau, Republic of China, Saudi Arabia, and Germany. Its clothes features casual urban and desaturated style. Promotional material uses the brand's website as the company logo. The clothing is "Asian-fit", slimmer than American and European brands.

The brand launched capsule collections with Dr. Martens (2012), Wrangler (2012), Fred Perry (2014), Playboy (2014).

The brand claims a close connection with the British culture, or the "cool London style". Its collection mainly consist of urban wear, or "high street" clothes according to the brand's verbiage.

== Controversy ==
Izzue was embroiled in controversy when it used Nazi Germany themes on its clothes and decor, including swastikas, banners, and propaganda films, as part of its decor during its 2003 season. Marketing manager Deborah Cheng apologized and issued a statement saying "that the designer did not realize that the Nazi symbols would be considered offensive."
