= Duke Seifried =

American game designer

Bruce "Duke" Seifried
- Born: August 19, 1935; Janesville, Wisconsin
- Died: September 29, 2018 (aged 83); Janesville, Wisconsin
- Occupations: Miniatures sculptor; Game designer; Salesman; Jazz musician

Bruce "Duke" Seifried (August 19, 1935 – September 29, 2018) was a creator and seller of military and fantasy miniatures for wargames and fantasy role-playing games. During his time as an executive and salesman at several miniature and game companies, he forged a bond between wargaming military miniatures and fantasy role-playing miniatures.

== Early life ==
Bruce Seifried, later nicknamed "Duke", was born in Janesville, Wisconsin. His father created and collected 54 mm military miniature soldiers, but did not allow young Bruce to touch them. When Bruce was older, his father gave Bruce some of his old casting molds he had sculpted in the 1930s. This led to Seifried teaching himself how to sculpt and cast his own. After graduating from Urbana High School in Urbana, Ohio, Seifried attended Miami University in Oxford, Ohio, majoring in speech/radio-television, graduating in 1957. During his time there, he discovered a love of music, performing with the a cappella choir, and also playing string bass and guitar with the "Campus Owls" swing band. He paid his way through university by giving lessons in string bass and guitar, as well as performing gigs at local clubs. He also completed advanced business studies from the American Management Association in Chicago.

After graduation, Siefried moved to Dayton, Ohio to work for WLW-D Television, then moved to an advertising firm to write jingles for various companies including Frigidaire.

== Miniatures ==
Seifried continued to sculpt miniature soldiers as a serious hobby, and in the late 1950s, formed a company, "Der Kriegspielers" ("The Wargamers") in order to sell them.

Seifried had read The Lord of the Rings before it had become well-known, and corresponded briefly with J.R.R. Tolkien; later, when he was in England on business, he arranged to meet with the author. During his visit, Seifried offered to sculpt "some pewter Hobbits, Dwarves and Goblins" for Tolkien. Tolkien apparently liked the idea, and he and Seifried made some rough sketches on the spot. When Siefried returned to the United States, he had Tim Kirk, a young artist with the American Greeting Card Company, create some professional renderings of the sketches from which Siefried could then sculpt 25 mm miniatures. Tolkien died before Seifried was finished, but Seifried forged ahead with the project. He founded a new company, Custom Cast, in 1972, and released a line of eight Tolkien figures called Der Kriegspielers Fantastiques. They were immediately popular, and Custom Cast sold over 10,000 sets.

Game historian Shannon Appelcline noted that "Seifried [is] one of the most influential people in the early hobbyist miniatures market. He created the idea of blister packs, to sell sets of infantry rather than individual figures, and later came up with the idea of including figures with slightly different poses in those packs. More importantly for the RPG [role-playing game] industry, he came up with the phrase 'adventure gaming' — which was used to differentiate RPGs from 'wargaming' in the earliest days of the hobby."

== Heritage Models ==
By 1976, Seifried was suffering from cash flow problems. Jim Oden, who in 1974 had founded Hinchcliffe Miniatures and opened The Royal Guardsmen, a Dallas retail store that sold military miniatures, was having the same problems. In January 1977, they agreed to merge Custom Cast and The Royal Guardsman into a new company, Heritage Models, with Oden as president, and Seifreid as vice-president and chief salesman.

The company under Oden ran into further financial difficulties. During a chance encounter, Seifried convinced millionaire Ray Stockman to buy out Oden's share of the company. Under Stockman, Heritage Models then became Heritage USA as a division under Heritage International.

== TSR ==
With the recession of the early 1980s and commensurate high interest rates, Heritage ran into further financial problems under Stockman. Seifried left Heritage in early 1982 to become Executive Vice-President at TSR, lured by company founder Gary Gygax to oversee the creation of TSR's own miniatures manufacturing division. At the Hobby Industries of America Show in late January 1983, TSR announced that Seifried would be in charge of their new Toys, Hobby & Gift Division.

Six months after that announcement, TSR underwent a major re-organization. Company executives Kevin Blume and Brian Blume were increasingly at odds with Gary Gygax, and in June 1983 shuffled him off to Hollywood as head of the new TSR Entertainment division. With Gygax out of the way, the rest of the company was divided into three new divisions, resulting in the lay-offs of more than 70 employees, including Seifried. Shannon Appelcline described Seifried's layoff as "probably the most stunning, as he was in charge of TSR's new miniatures manufacturing — and was someone who really knew the business. Some suggested the reason was political, as Seifried had been among Gary Gygax's top supporters."

== After TSR ==
Following his lay-off, Seifried started up Creative Concepts, and consulted for toy companies. Seifried also started to construct elaborate dioramas of battles both historical and fictional, calling them his "extravaganzas." By the end of his life, he had created over 80 of these, more than half of them sold to patrons around the world.

== Personal life ==
Seifried was married twice, having six children with his first wife, and adopting twins with his second wife. Following retirement, he moved back to his birthplace, Janesville, Wisconsin, where he continued to play jazz at local spots as well as at churches he attended.

In 2010, Seifried was diagnosed with idiopathic pulmonary fibrosis, and was given 6–18 months to live. He continued to appear at conventions, teach young musicians, play jazz and work on his "extravaganzas", and survived for nearly a decade. Duke Seifried died on September 29, 2018, age 83.

== Awards and Legacy ==
- 1989: Midwest Wargamer's Association Award for Services to Wargaming.
- 1995: Jack Scruby Award
- 2005: Inducted into Origins Hall of Fame.
- 2005: Inducted into Game Manufacturers Association (GAMA) Hall of Fame.
- 2010: Presented with Game Master Lifetime Achievement Award by the Historical Miniatures Gaming Society (HMGS), which was thereafter renamed the "Duke Seifried Game Master Lifetime Achievement Award".
- 2015: Industry Insider Guest of Honor, Gen Con 2015.
