= SuperDisk =

Storage medium from Imation

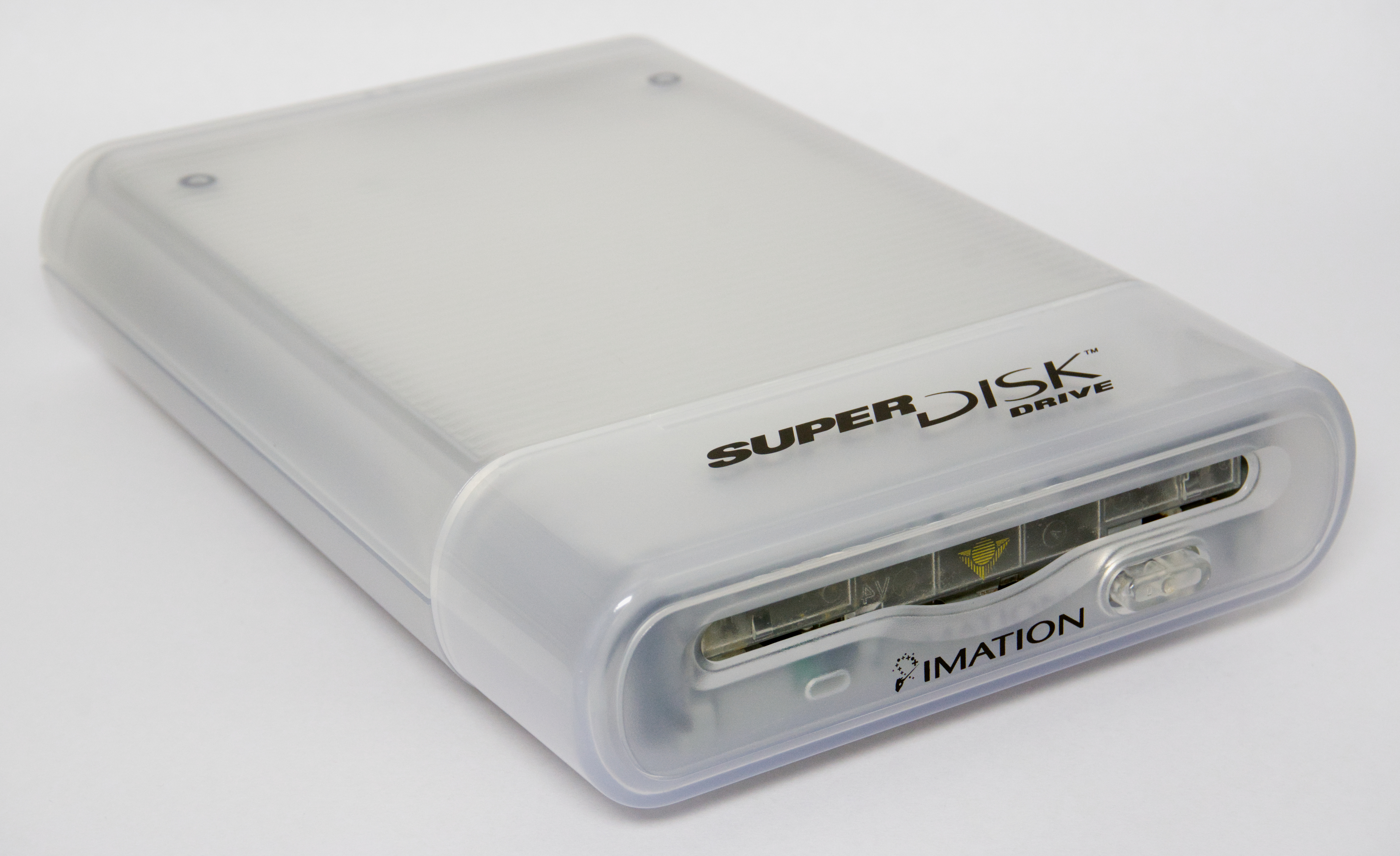
Imation SuperDisk drive

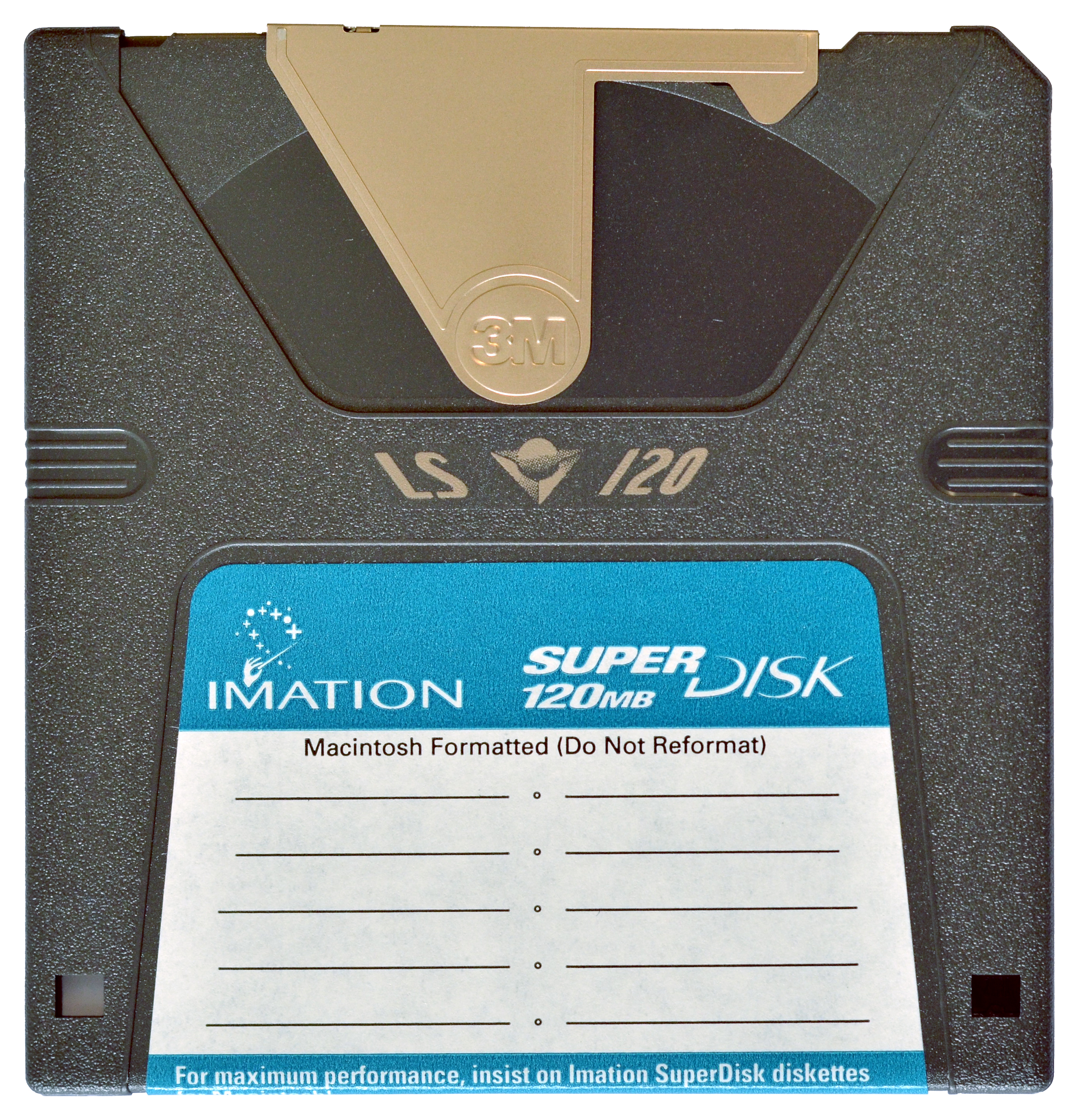
An LS-120 disk

The SuperDisk LS-120 is a high-speed, high-capacity alternative to the 90 mm (3.5 in), 1.44 MB floppy disk. The SuperDisk hardware was created by 3M's storage products group Imation in 1996, with manufacturing chiefly by Matsushita.

The SuperDisk had limited success in North America; Compaq, Gateway and Dell were among the relatively few OEMs to support it. The second-generation SuperDisk LS-240 drives saw broader distribution in Asia and Australia, where more models and media were released. LS-240 drives were also marketed in North America, including external USB models sold through retail channels, such as the QPS Que! SuperDisk 240 in 2001.

The widespread introduction of rewritable CD-RW around the same time undermined the role for the SuperDisk. SuperDisk worldwide ceased manufacturing in 2003.

== History ==
The design of the SuperDisk system came from an early 1990s project at Iomega. It is one of the last examples of floptical technology, where lasers are used to guide a magnetic head which is much smaller than those used in traditional floppy disk drives. Iomega orphaned the project around the time they decided to release the Zip drive in 1994. The idea eventually ended up at 3M, where the concept was refined and the design was licensed to established floppy drive makers Matsushita and Mitsubishi. Other companies involved in the development of SuperDisk include Compaq and OR Technology.

Matsushita continued development of the technology and released the LS-240. It has double the capacity of the LS-120 and the added feature of being able to format regular floppy disks to 32 MB capacity. However, this higher density comes at a price – the entire disk must be rewritten any time a change is made, much like early CD-RW media.

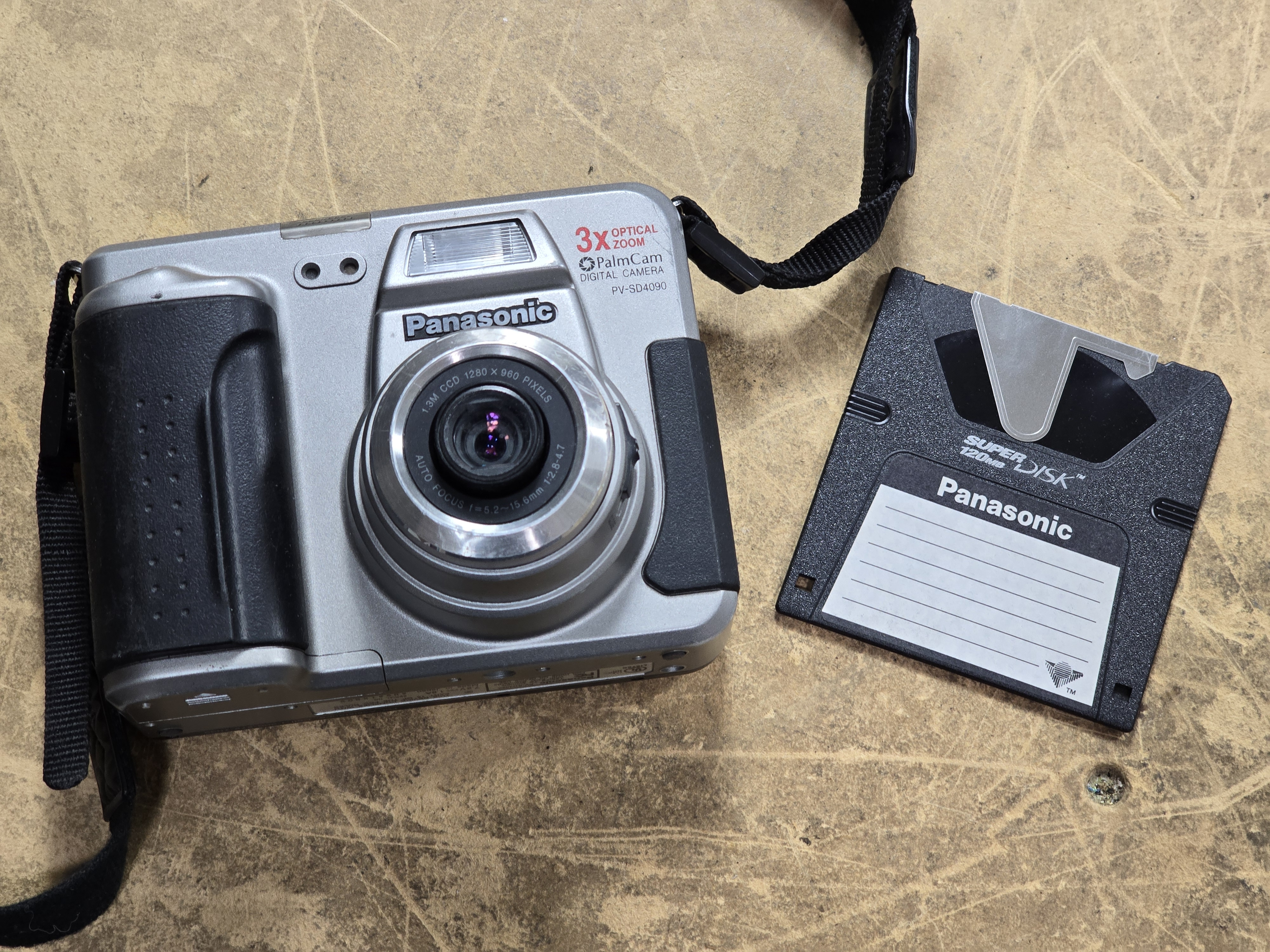
Panasonic PV-SD4090 digital camera

A SuperDisk drive was used in two Panasonic digital cameras, the PV-SD4090 and PV-SD5000, which allowed them to use both SuperDisk (LS-120) and 3.5″ floppy disks as the memory media.

== Technical information ==
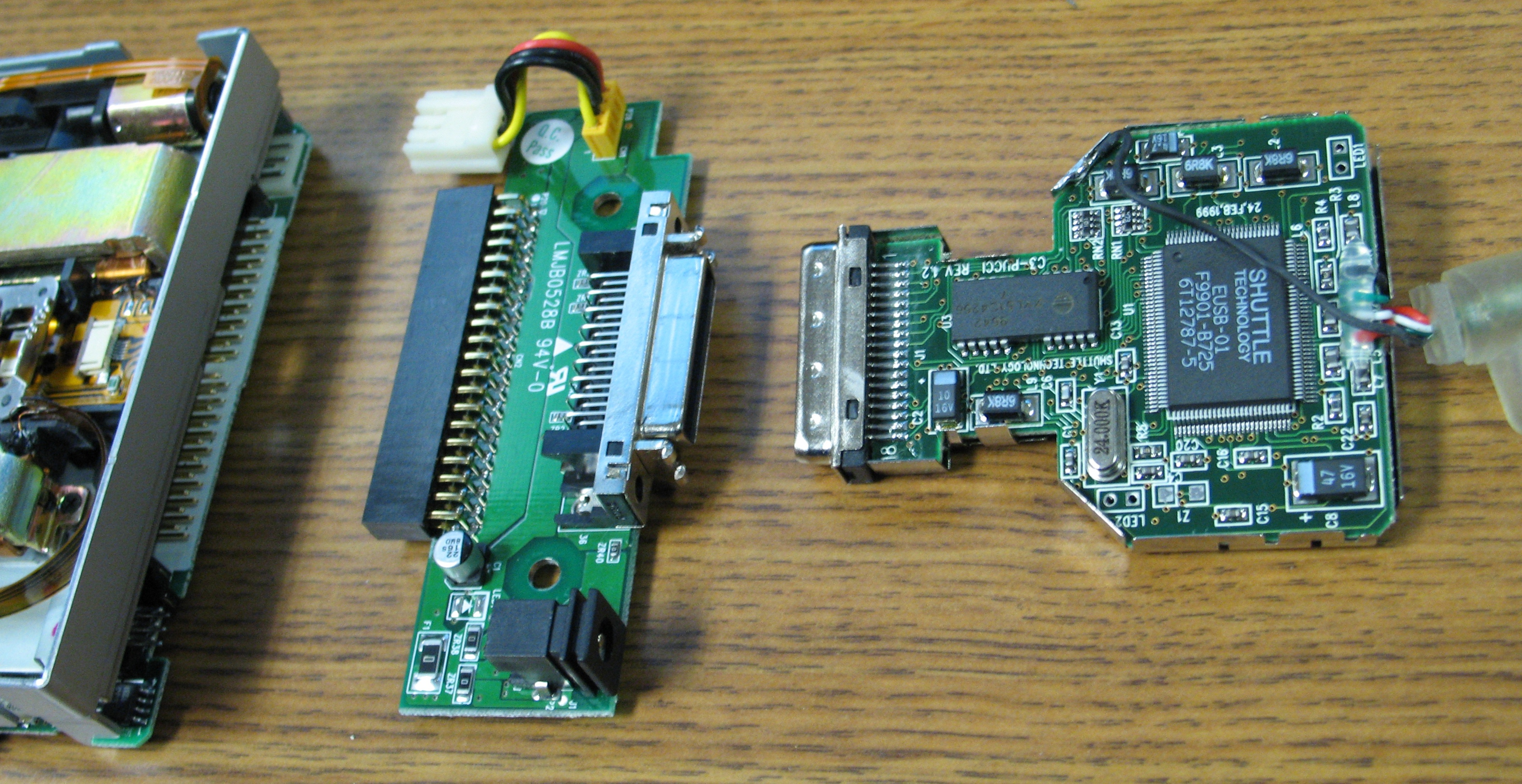
Circuit components of the external USB SuperDisk for Macintosh. The drive itself is the same size as a standard 3.5″ floppy drive, but uses an ATA interface. On the right is the USB-to-ATA adapter, which plugs into an intermediate fan-out and power supply daughterboard that is inside the rear of the Mac drive's casing. This particular drive cannot function using USB power alone.

This shows the technology of the SuperDisk drive. Two voice coil servomotors move the drive heads precisely across the disk surface. BLUE - The main servo with a large coil provides the primary force to move the head mechanism. YELLOW - A secondary smaller coil primarily acts to keep the head mechanism aligned parallel with the disk surface. RED - The drive eject motor allows the disk to be under computer control so that it normally will not eject until the computer has completed its read or writing tasks.

The SuperDisk's format was designed to supersede the low-capacity 3½-inch floppy disks with its higher-capacity media that imitated the ubiquitous format with its own 120 MB (and later 240 MB) disk storage while the SuperDisk drive itself was backwards compatible with 1.44 MB, 1.2 MB, 720 KB floppy formats (MFM). Superdisk drives read and write faster to these sorts of disks than conventional 1.44 MB or 720 KB floppy drives.

The newer LS-240 drives also have the ability to read and write regular 1.44 MB floppies at much higher densities in a format called "FD32MB". Described in the help file for the SuperWriter32 application included with the driver package, the increase of capacity for FD32MB is achieved through the use of shingled magnetic recording (SMR) to reduce track pitch to 18.8μm from the standard 187.5μm, allowing 777 tracks per side. This is combined with linear recording density improvements enabling 36-53 sectors per track through partial-response maximum-likelihood and zone bit recording.

The true capacity of these "SD120MB" drives is 120.375 MiB aka 126.22 MB (FAT16B with logical geometry 963/8/32 CHS × 512 bytes). The "SD240MB" drives have a capacity of 229.25 MiB aka 240.39 MB (FAT16B with logical geometry 262/32/56 CHS × 512 bytes). 1.44 MB HD floppies formatted to 32 MB as "FD32MB" (FAT16B with logical geometry 1024/2/32 CHS × 512 bytes) in the LS-240 show a dummy FAT12 file system (with logical geometries 160/2/9 or 80/2/18) when inserted into a normal floppy drive.

SuperDisk drives have been sold in parallel port, USB, ATAPI and SCSI variants.

Imation also released a version of the SuperDisk with "Secured Encryption Technology", which uses Blowfish with a 64-bit key to encrypt the contents.

Under Windows XP's sfloppy.sys driver, a USB SuperDisk drive will appear as a 3.5″ floppy disk drive, receiving either the drive letter A: (if there is no floppy in the machine) or B: (if there already is one). This enables use by software that expects a floppy drive when 1.44 MB or 720 KB disks are inserted. 120 MB and 240 MB disks are also accessed via A: or B:.

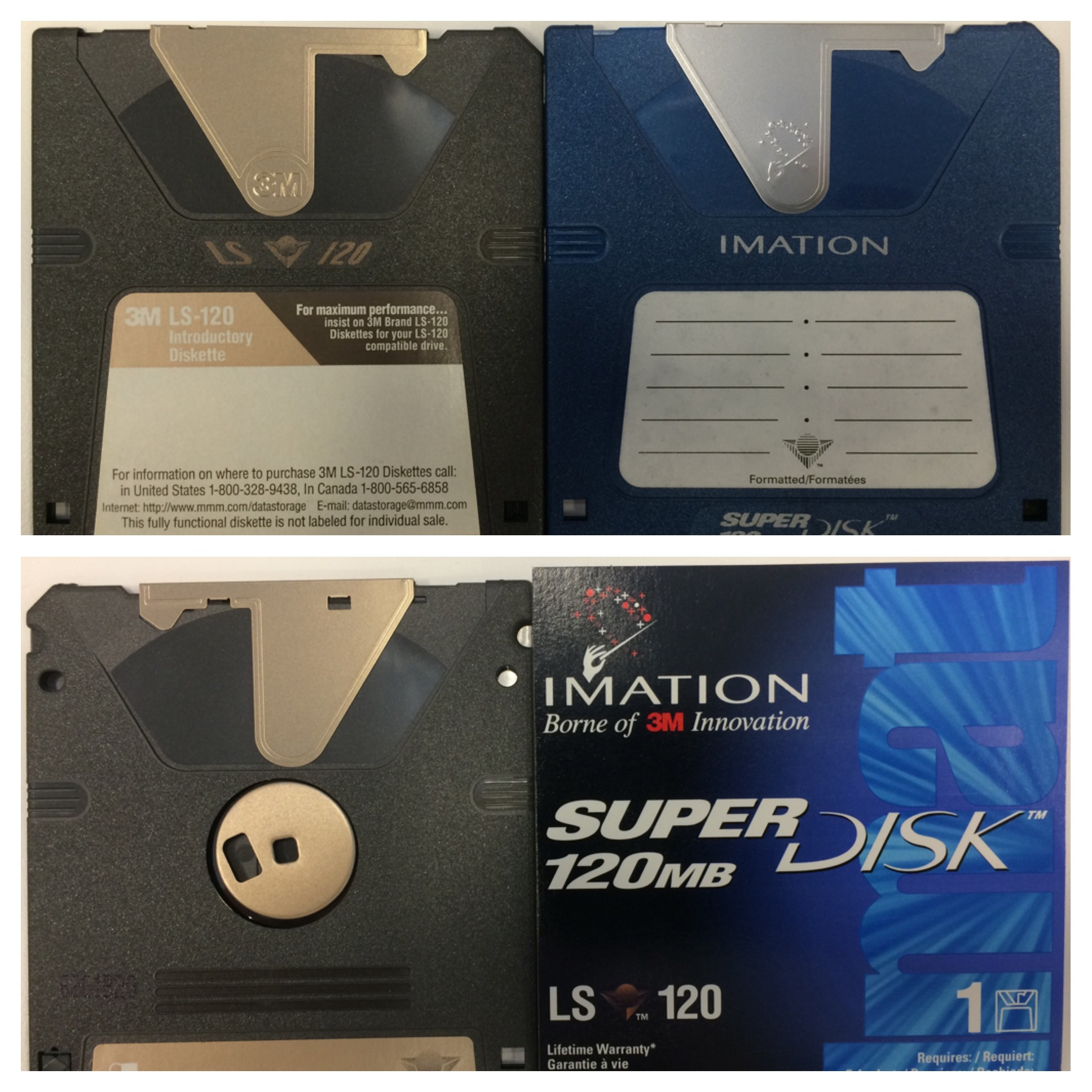
Imation SuperDisk LS-120 diskettes

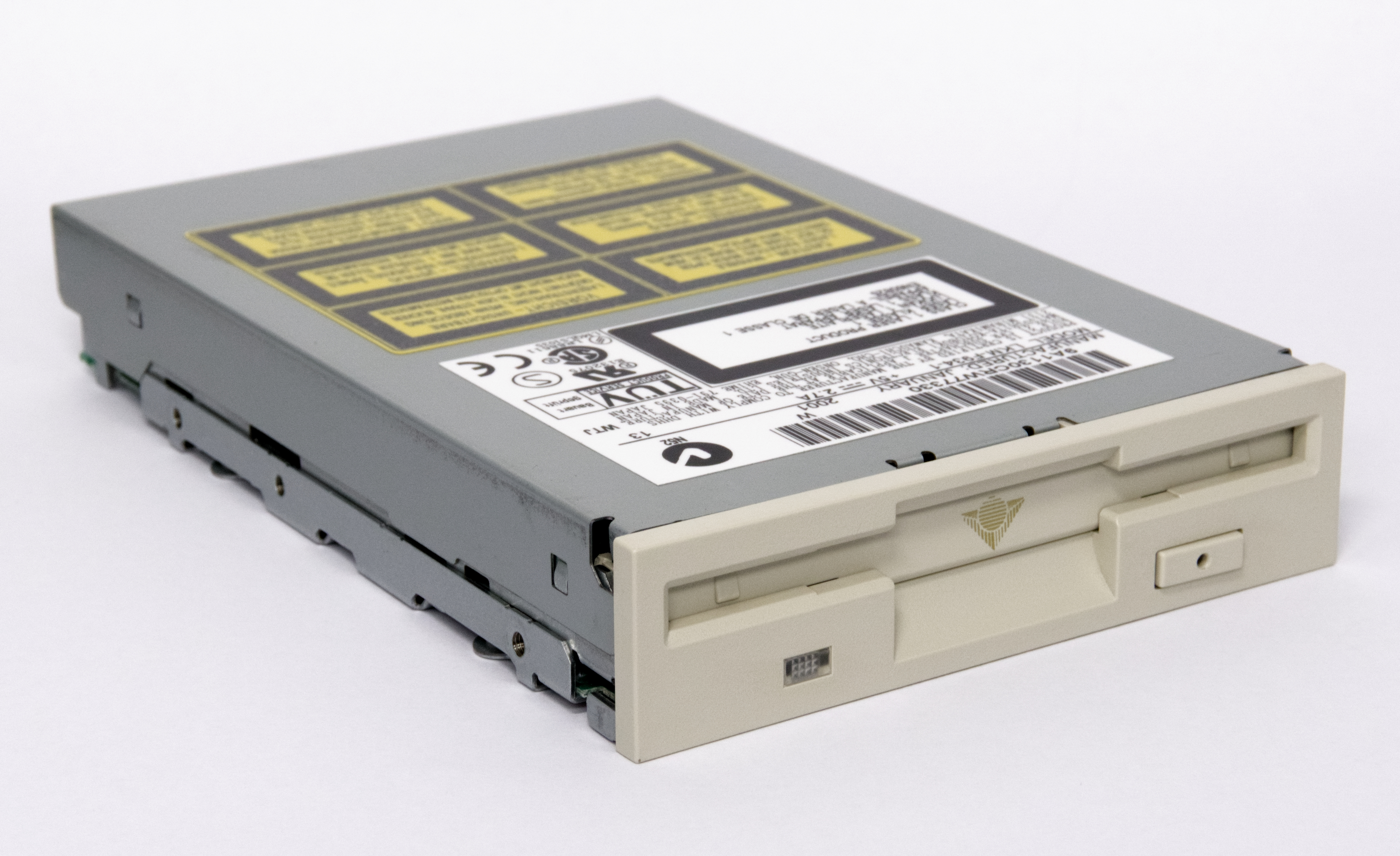
Internal 3.5″ SuperDisk drive

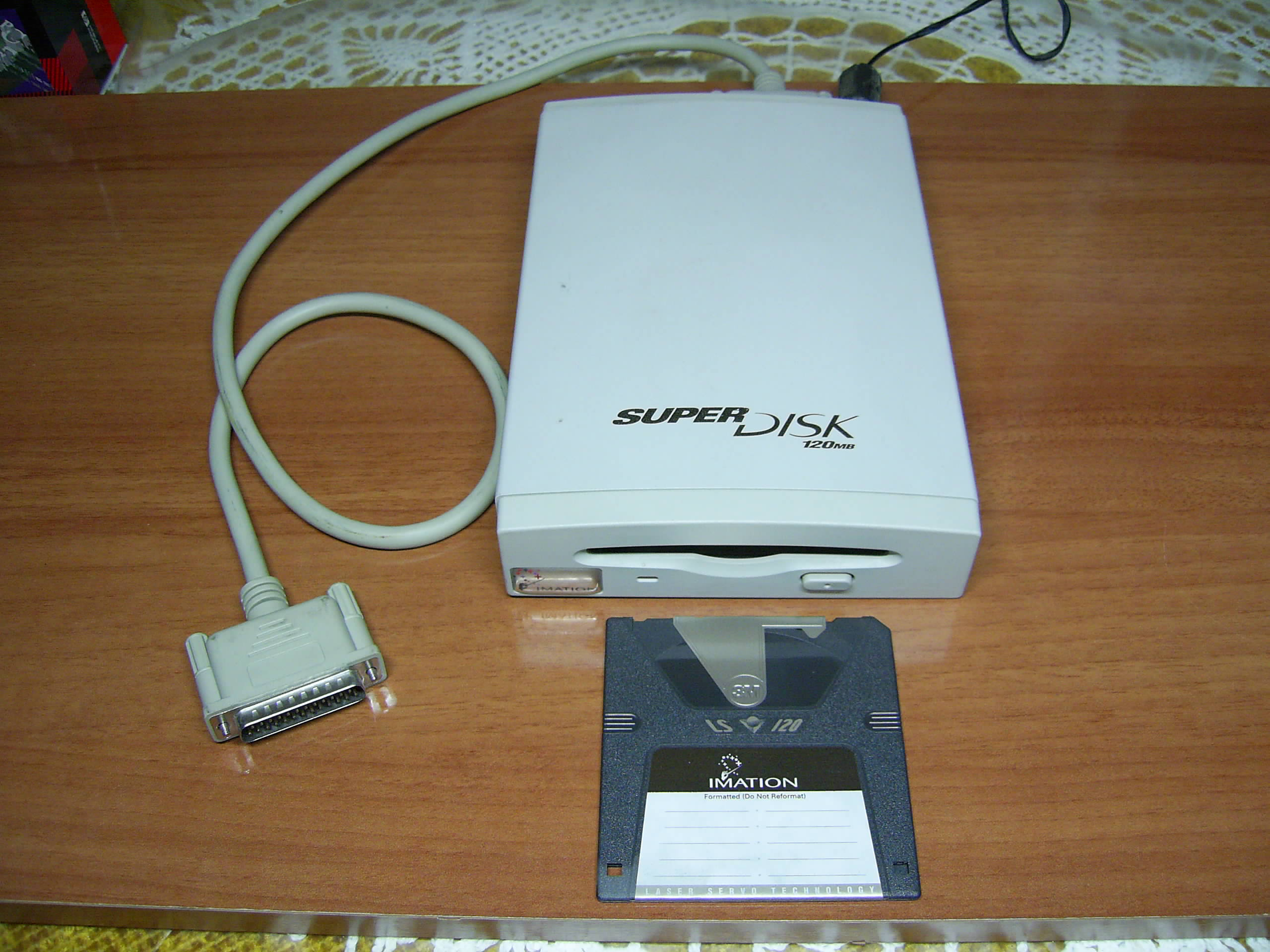
External parallel port SuperDisk drive

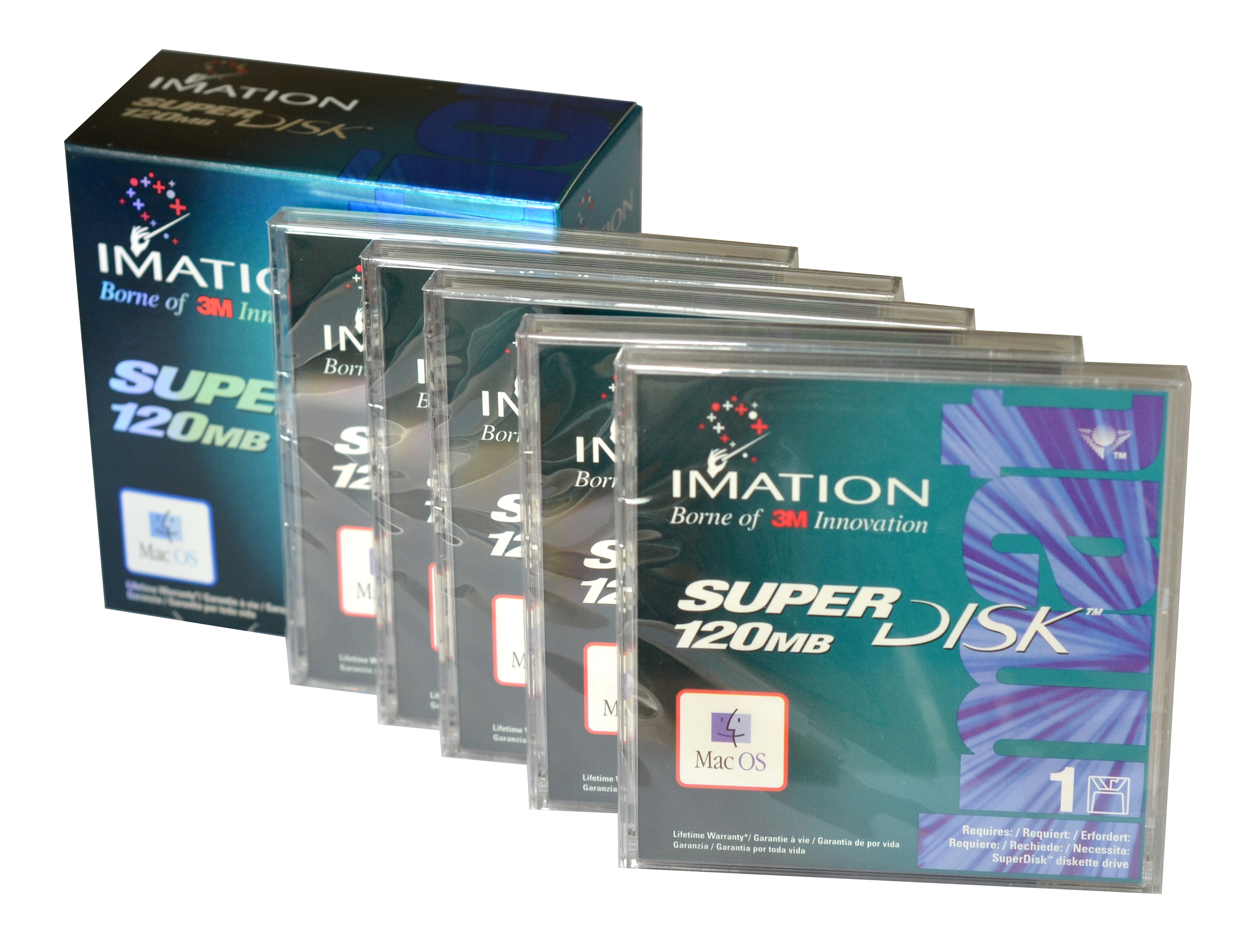
SuperDisk 120MB diskettes in packaging

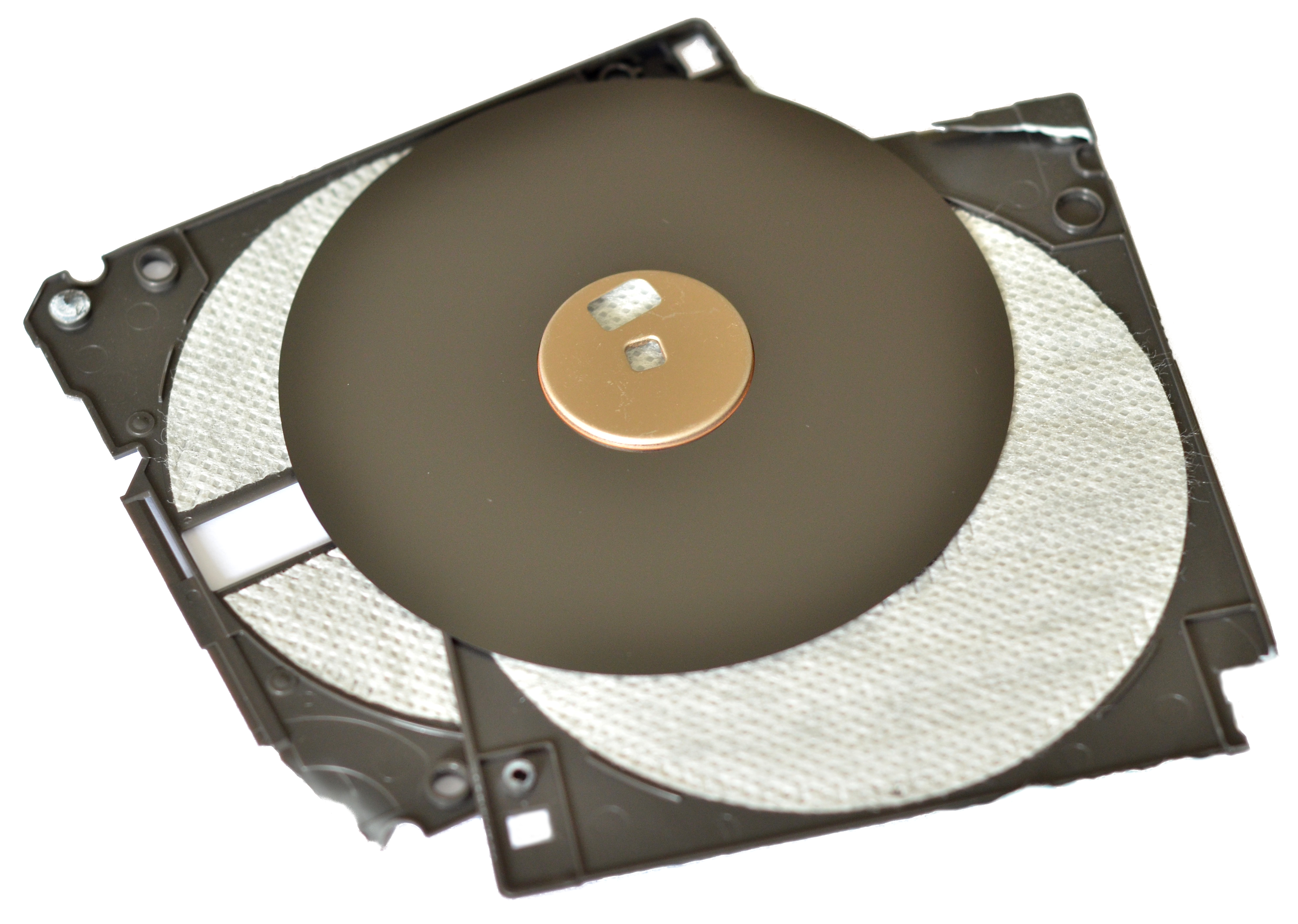
SuperDisk 120MB diskette disassembly

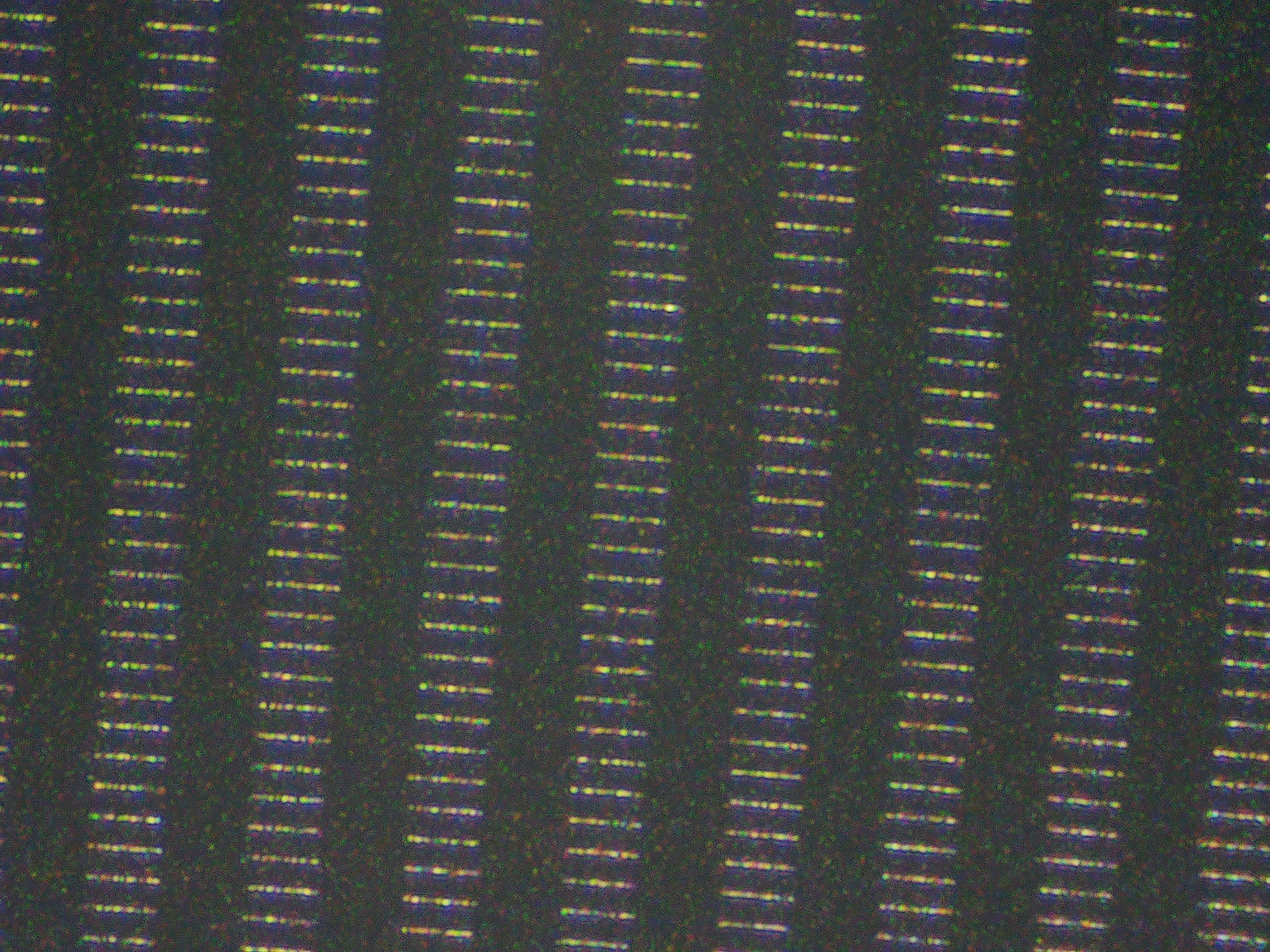
SuperDisk 120MB optical alignment tracks at 200× magnification

== Criticism and obsolescence ==
Older 800KB and 400KB Macintosh floppies, using GCR, did not work with a SuperDisk drive. These disks could be used in a SuperDisk drive only if formatted to PC 720 KB MFM format. Note that almost no USB floppy drives supported Mac GCR floppies.

By 2000, the entire removable magnetic disk category was finally obsoleted by the falling prices of CD-R and CD-RW drives, and later on solid-state (USB flash drives or USB keydrives).

== Practicality ==
The USB models were quite popular for debugging and installing servers that did not have a CD drive available. They could both store massive numbers of drivers for installation purposes as well as be used to run live operating systems, such as ReactOS, which amounts to 150 MB.

== See also ==
- Caleb UHD144
- IBM Extended Density Format, technically unrelated special format for traditional HD floppy controllers, also providing a mini file system containing a README file similar to the LS-240's FD32M format.
- Sony HiFD
