= Star Commandos =

1980 board game

Star Commandos is a 1980 board game published by Heritage Models.

== Gameplay ==
Star Commandos is a game that comes as a set of 25mm lead miniatures including paints and rules.

== Reception ==
Tony Watson reviewed Star Commandos in The Space Gamer No. 33. Watson commented that "While the concept behind Star Commandos was good one, I can't recommend it to most gamers because of its high price."
