= Strange New World =

Strange New World(s) may refer to:

== Star Trek ==
- Star Trek: Strange New Worlds, an American science fiction television series
  - "Strange New Worlds" (Star Trek: Strange New Worlds), the premiere episode of the television series
- Star Trek: Strange New Worlds (short story collection), a science fiction anthology series of licensed, fan-written, short stories
- "Strange new worlds", part of the original Star Trek title sequence that ends with "where no man has gone before"
- "Strange New World" (Star Trek: Enterprise), a first-season episode of the sixth Star Trek TV series

== Other uses ==
- Strange New World (film), an American made-for-television science fiction film
- "Strange New World", a fourth-season episode of the animated television series The Batman
- Strange New Worlds (board game), published by Heritage Models in 1978

== See also ==
- O Strange New World, a book written by Howard Mumford Jones in 1964
