= It =

It or IT most often refers to:

- It (pronoun), in English
- Information technology

It or IT may also refer to:

== Arts, entertainment and media ==
=== Fictional characters ===
- It, the Psammead, title character in the 1902 novel Five Children and It
- It! The Living Colossus, a 1961 comic book character
- IT, a character in the 1962 novel A Wrinkle in Time
- It (character), or Pennywise, title character in Stephen King's 1986 novel It

=== Film and television ===
- It (1927 film), an American silent film
- It! The Terror from Beyond Space, a 1958 science fiction film
- It! (1967 film), a British horror film
- It (1989 film), a Soviet comedy film
- It (miniseries), 1990, based on Stephen King's novel
- It (Phish video), a 2004 DVD set about the Phish festival
- Incredible Tales, or I.T., a 2004 Singaporean horror anthology TV series
- I.T. (film), 2016, starring Pierce Brosnan
- It (2017 film), the first in a two-part adaptation of Stephen King's novel
  - It Chapter Two, a 2019 sequel film
    - It: Welcome to Derry, a 2025 TV series serving as a prequel to both films

=== Gaming and play ===
- Tag (game), or "It", a playground game
- It (board game), a 1978 tank battle game
- It, a ropes course at several locations of Jordan's Furniture, in New England, US

=== Literature ===
- It (novel), by Stephen King, 1986
- "It!" (short story), by Theodore Sturgeon, 1940
- It (poetry collection), by Inger Christensen, 1969
- It, a 2014 book by Alexa Chung
- International Times, the name of various underground newspapers
- Illinois Times, a weekly free newspaper

=== Music ===
==== Albums ====
- It (Pulp album), 1983
- "It" the Album album by Alien Sex Friend, 1986
- It (Alan Vega album), 2017

==== Songs ====
- "it.", by Genesis from the 1974 album The Lamb Lies Down on Broadway
- "It", by Prince from the 1987 album Sign o' the Times
- "iT", by Christine and the Queens from the 2014 album Chaleur humaine
- "It", a 2015 song by Niki and Gabi

==== Other uses in music ====
- It (Phish festival), the band's festivals and tours in the US since 1990
- "IT" (radio program), on XM Satellite Radio 2002–2007
- Tony Särkkä, or It, a Swedish black metal musician

== Electricity and computing ==
- Information technology
- .it, the Internet top-level domain for Italy
- IT (file format), an audio file format used by Impulse Tracker
- IT (isolé terre), an electrical earthing system
- it drive, a floppy disk drive by Caleb, 1998–2002

== Transportation ==
- Air Inter, a French airline 1958–1997, IATA code IT
- Kingfisher Airlines, an Indian airline 2004–2012, IATA code IT
- Tigerair Taiwan, a Taiwanese airline since 2014, IATA code IT
- Intelligent Transit, a 2009–2015 bus service in West Virginia, U.S.
- Enduro IT, a series of Yamaha motorcycles
- Dynasty IT, a Canadian electric car

== Language ==
- It (pronoun), in English
- Italian language, ISO 639-1 language code it
- It markers, in the Aṣṭādhyāyī Sanskrit grammar text

== Other uses ==
- Iran Standard Time, or Iran Time, a time zone
- Italy, ISO 3166 code IT
- I.T, founded 1988, a Hong Kong fashion conglomerate
- Isomeric transition, a decay process in an atomic nucleus

== See also ==
- It girl, a charismatic young woman
- Cousin Itt, a fictional character in The Addams Family
- Getting It: The Psychology of est, a book
- Inferior temporal gyrus, or IT cortex, a region of the brain
