= Der Kriegspielers Fantastiques =

American game miniatures manufacturer

The "Fellowship of the Ring" figurines, part of the Lord of the Rings line produced in 1974. Image from White Dwarf #4

Der Kriegspielers Fantastiques was a line of fantasy miniature figures that were produced by Custom Cast and then Heritage Models beginning in the 1970s.

== Publication history ==
American miniature sculptor Duke Seifried founded his own company, Der Kriegspielers ("The Wargamers") in the 1950s to make Napoleonic figures for retail sale.

In the late 1960s, Seifried corresponded briefly with J.R.R. Tolkien; later, when he was in England on business, he arranged to meet with the author. During his visit, Seifried offered to sculpt "some pewter Hobbits, Dwarves and Goblins" for Tolkien. Tolkien apparently liked the idea, and he and Seifried made some rough sketches on the spot. When Siefried returned to the United States, he had Tim Kirk, a young artist with the American Greeting Card Company, create some professional renderings of the sketches from which Siefried could then sculpt 25 mm miniatures. Tolkien died before Seifried was finished, but Seifried forged ahead with the project.

In 1972, he formed the company Custom Cast in Dayton, Ohio. In late 1974, Custom Cast released a new line of 25 mm figures called Der Kriegspielers Fantastiques ("The Fantasy Wargamers"), and the first product was a set of miniatures based on characters from Tolkien's The Fellowship of the Ring. Coinciding with both the publication of the first fantasy role-playing game Dungeons & Dragons in 1974, and the continuing popularity of The Lord of the Rings in the United States, Der Kriegspielers Fantastiques proved to be very popular, and the Fellowship of the Ring line sold 10,000 units very quickly. Seifried quickly followed up with other Tolkienesque figures before branching off into more generic fantasy figures.

Although Der Kriegspielers Fantastiques was the first very successful fantasy miniature line in the United States, it was not the first to be sold in the United States. As historian Shannon Applecline noted in the 2014 book Designers and Dragons, "US miniatures maker Jack Scruby beat Seifried to the fantasy punch with a 30mm line that he sold at Gen Con VII (1974)."

Custom Cast later merged with Heritage Models, which continued to produce figures for the Fantastique line, even after Siefried left the company to work at TSR.

== Reception ==
In the February–March 1978 edition of White Dwarf (Issue #5), John Norris thought that the Tolkienesque figures of the Fantastiques line "should be of particular interest to Tolkien addicts, because they are by far the most suitable range currently available for wargames set in his Middle Earth." He also thought the figures would be of use to other fantasy role-players not using a Middle Earth setting, saying they would "find that the personality figures, and indeed many of the ordinary ones, make excellent character figures, while dungeon owners will find the range a prolific source of 'monsters' with which to populate the dungeon and the surrounding wilderness." Norris thought the quality of the small 25 mm figures was "generally good, except for the few very large ones, which are nearly all poor. The strongest point of the range is its variety. Not only does it cover all the major types, but it also provides an excellent selection of figures for each one."

== Reviews ==
- Campaign (Issue No. 83, Jan–Feb 1978, Don Lowry)
- The Journal Times (Racine, Ohio): June 26, 2004, p. 14
