= Spellmaker =

Board game

Spellmaker is a board game for two to four players published by Gametime Games, a subsidiary of Heritage Models, in 1978.

== Gameplay ==
Spellmaker is a fantasy game where wizards are competing against each other to rescue a princess from captivity by a dragon. The first wizard to successfully lead the princess to his castle is the winner. The wizard stays in his tower for the entire game and from afar, uses a variety of creatures (giants, princes, dwarves, and frogs) to escort the princess. Combat is resolved with a simple "larger creature wins", but movement takes place before combat, so a weaker creature can move away from a more powerful creature before combat takes place. Of more importance to victory is the use of magic to create new creatures and move them (and the princess) towards a particular wizard's castle.

== Reception ==
In the March–April 1979 edition of The Space Gamer (Issue No. 22) Norman S. Howe found the game had problems: "Spellmaker is a very exciting game, but much too well-balanced. Whenever one player starts to win the others gang up on him and obliterate his pieces."

In the April–May 1979 edition of White Dwarf (Issue 12), Don Turnbull gave the game a below average score of 6 out of 10. Turnbull liked the high quality of the game components, but he also had issues with the four-player game, finding that it was impossible for anyone to win. He concluded, "I am in a quandary about a recommendation. Played 'straight', I cannot honestly recommend the game, but it has many entertaining qualities... A pity. Here is an excellent idea, but something went wrong in the works."

In the October 1979 edition of Dragon (Issue 30), Bruce Boegman especially liked the game when played by only two players, finding that when three or four players played, there was no room on the board to properly maneuver. "This is my only criticism of an excellent game, which provides fine entertainment and can be played in the time that it takes a DM to persuade some obnoxious player that his character really did die."

== Reviews ==
- Games #14
