= Bonkers! (game) =

Board game

- Original 1978 Parker Brothers version of Bonkers!
- Publishers: Parker Brothers, Milton Bradley
- Players: 2-4
- Chance: High (dice rolling, card drawing)

Bonkers! (also known as This Game is Bonkers!) is a race-style board game designed by Paul J. Gruen and produced first by Parker Brothers, later by Milton Bradley, and briefly reissued by Winning Moves. The object is to be the first player to score 12 points by adding instruction cards to the empty spaces in an attempt to move to several scoring stations. The game's slogan (for all versions) is "It's Never the Same Game Twice!"

== Set up ==
The original 1978 Parker Brothers game board of Bonkers!

Each game of Bonkers! comes with the following:

- a gameboard
- four pawns
- a stack of cardboard track cards
  - 2 each of the following "Back" cards
    - 1 through 6, 10, 12
  - 2 each of the following "Ahead" cards
    - 1 through 6, 10, 12
  - 2 each of the following special cards
    - Go to Nearest Score
    - Roll Again
    - Go to Start
    - Exchange Cards
- a score card with plastic peg markers
- four large "Go to Lose" cards
- two dice

The board consists of a 55-space looping track. Most spaces have an outline of a track card next to it, the cards being played throughout the game; there are also three "Score" stations (one of which doubles as the starting point), a "Lose" space, two spaces marked "Go to Lose", and one space marked "Back 15".

As the original Bonkers! was produced in the late 1970s, the board and game pieces accordingly had a disco styled text and motif. When Milton Bradley revived the game in the early 1990s, the board was made to appear as if the entire track and logo were made from modeling clay; a few humorous caricatures of human faces (also made from clay) were placed in the logo and on the board as well. The game was also given a fluorescent color scheme, updated fonts, and different styled dice and pawns from the original. The 2016 Winning Moves reissue returned to the original disco motif.

== Gameplay (Original 1978 Parker Brothers version) ==
The game starts with each player being dealt four track cards and a large "Go to Lose" card, and placing their pawns on the scoring space marked "Start". On a turn, a player rolls the dice and moves the corresponding number of spaces. If the space is empty, the player places a track card in the outline next to that space and follows its directions; if already occupied by a card, the player follows the instructions on that card. A player's turn ends if landing on an unoccupied space marked "Score" (scoring 1 point), the space marked "Lose" (deducting 1 point), or on an unmarked space after having played one card. At the end of a turn, the player draws another card to replace any played during his or her turn, and the next player takes their turn.

Most track cards have a number between 1 and 6, in addition to 10 and 12, as well as the direction for the player to travel. The track is a loop; as pawns travel counterclockwise along the loop, "ahead" cards move the pawn forward and "back" cards move it in reverse. Other cards include "Roll Again", "Go to Nearest 'Score'", "Go to Start", and "Exchange Cards" (in which the player swaps the Exchange card for any other card currently on the track.)

If a space is occupied by another pawn, the player rolls again (except for the Lose space) while disregarding any instructions on any adjacent track card (but still scoring a point on Score spaces).

=== Scoring ===
The object of the game is to play track cards in a way that directs one's pawn to a "Score" space, upon which the scorekeeper moves that player's peg ahead one point. A player can also score by rolling a 12 or by means of "Entrapment": If the player's pawn ends in a continual loop (for example, ahead 2/ahead 3/back 5), that player is said to be "trapped", at which point his or her pawn is left on the space at the "front" of the trap, and the player scores one point. If a player lands on a Score space that is already occupied, he/she scores a point and rolls again.

=== The Lose Space ===
There is one space on the board marked "Lose". Players landing on this space lose one point and their turn ends immediately (even if the space is already occupied by one or more pawns.) Two spaces on the back of the track send the player directly to "Lose". In addition, each player has a large "Go to Lose" card; at any point in a player's turn, an opponent can use this card against that player to force him or her to go to the Lose space immediately. Once a large "Go to Lose" card is played, it is removed from the game. At no time can a player's score drop below zero.

=== Winning ===
The first player to score 12 points wins the game.

== Rule changes (Milton Bradley version) ==
When Milton Bradley began producing Bonkers!, there were several minor rules changes:

- Cards marked "Exchange Cards" could now only be switched with a track card directly to the left or to the right of the Exchange card.
- Entrapment was now referred to as "Going Bonkers"; if a player got caught in a loop, s/he moved his/her pawn ahead to the nearest Score space (instead of the "ahead" card) and scored one point.
- The "Go to Nearest Score" card was replaced with a "Go Ahead to Score" card (possibly to reduce ambiguity in the game.)

Other than these small changes, and the cosmetic update to the game, Bonkers! remained virtually unchanged from the first version.

== Rule changes (Winning Moves version) ==
In addition to reusing the original disco theme, the 2016 Winning Moves reissue also reverted to the original Parker Brothers rules.

== Rule changes (Hasbro Gaming version) ==
The pawns are now cutesy characters. The game now has a more modern theme. The original Parker Brothers rules are also intact.
