= LTT =

LTT may refer to:

- Libya Telecom & Technology, a telecommunications company based in Libya
- Light the Torch, an American rock band formerly known as Devil You Know
- Linus Tech Tips, a Canadian tech-related YouTube channel
- Linux Trace Toolkit, for tracing computer program execution
- Lithuanian talonas, ISO 4217 code
- Lokmanya Tilak Terminus, a railway terminus in Mumbai, India
- Luyten Two-Tenths catalogue, a catalog of proper motions for stars
