= Star Fighter (board game) =

Star Fighter is a 1978 board game published by Heritage Models under the name of Gametime Games.

== Gameplay ==
Star Fighter is a simple science fiction game of tactical space combat playable by two to four players.

== Reception ==
Tony Watson reviewed Starfighter in The Space Gamer No. 23. Watson commented that "The rules are simple enough to allow you to play with wives or girlfriends, little brothers or sons, but Starfighter offers a tactical interest which even more jaded SF gamers can appreciate. All in all, it is a fun little game, further enhanced by its high physical quality."
