= Cyborg (board game) =

Board game

Cyborg is a 1978 board wargame published by Excalibre Games.

== Gameplay ==
Cyborg is a game in which Princess Gloriana and her band of loyal followers fight their way to the Holy City to assume the throne while her evil aunt and her Necromancers want to drop the princess into a volcano.

== Reception ==
W. G. Armintrout reviewed Cyborg in The Space Gamer No. 25. Armintrout commented that "Cyborg is a fun game. It is a challenging game, and the believable premise makes it easier to want to play the game over and over again. It may look like a grown-up version of Monopoly, but it is a really good game."
