= Star Trek: Adventure Gaming in the Final Frontier =

Science fiction tabletop role-playing game

- Designers: Michael Scott
- Publishers: Heritage Models
- Publication: 1978
- Genres: Science fiction (Star Trek)
- Systems: Custom

Star Trek: Adventure Gaming in the Final Frontier is a role-playing game set in the fictional Star Trek universe. The game was published and edited by Heritage Models from 1978 until Heritage Models dropped the Star Trek gaming license.

== Setting ==
Star Trek: Adventure Gaming in the Final Frontier is set on unexplored planets within the United Federation of Planets Starfleet. Most player characters are members of Starfleet engaged in planetary exploration missions. The game is set in the original TV series era (a.d. 2260s) and Star Trek: The Animated Series TV series.

== The first Star Trek RPG license ==
In 1978, Paramount Pictures licensed Heritage Models to produce the first official Star Trek RPG and figure line based on Star Trek: The Original Series and Star Trek: The Animated Series.

== System ==
The rules are split into a “Basic Game” using pre-generated characters from the series and an “Advanced Game” with full character creation and additional combat rules like random initiative.

=== The basics ===
The basic rules include a section on preparing to play, explanations of six characteristics, movement, hand-to-hand and ranged combat rules, sequence of play for the “action phase,” and a list of twenty personalities along with their characteristic values. It also includes brief descriptions of Star Trek equipment and an example of play.

=== Character generation ===
Characters have six attributes (Strength, Dexterity, Constitution, Charisma, Luck, and Mentality) generated by 3d6 rolls modified by race. The rules include a hand-to-hand class bonus but no other skills or experience rules. Players resolve melee combat in a single damage step. The attacker rolls 1d6-6d6 (depending on weapon) plus Strength, Dexterity, and hand-to-hand class modifiers. The defender subtracts 1d6 plus Luck and hand-to-hand class modifiers from this total to determine damage. Ranged combat requires a 1d6 roll under a hit number which depends on range and the attacker's Dexterity.

Most humanoid characters from the original Star Trek TV series or animated series are playable character types. These include: Humans, Vulcans, Tellarites, Andorians, Orions, Klingon, Caitians, Edoans, and Romulans.

Using the basic rules, players use the pre-generated bridge crew from the show, including Captain Kirk, Mr Spock, Lieutenant Uhura, Yeoman Janice Rand, M’ress, and Arex from Paramount's Star Trek: The Animated Series.

==== Advanced rules ====
About twenty pages of information charts and rule expansions allows for more advanced play. The advanced section contains rules for creating original characters, a list of lifeforms and their characteristics from the TV series, advanced combat rules, and a list of equipment.

The rules included descriptions of alien races, including Larry Niven's Kzin, an equipment list, tables for randomly generated aliens, and two introductory scenarios.

=== Starships ===
The game offers no starship rules, as adventurers participate in landing party missions using rules for personal-level roleplaying.

== Official rulebooks ==
- Star Trek: Adventure Gaming in the Final Frontier (1978)

== Unofficial supplements ==
“Star Trek: Beyond the Final Frontier” was written by Paul Montgomery Crabaugh and appeared in Different Worlds #18 (the January 1982 issue) published by Chaosium, Inc. The article was seven pages in length with fifteen small tables (pages 10–16). Here is the brief editorial blurb from the beginning of the article: “Written to supplement Star Trek: Adventure Gaming in the Final Frontier role-playing rules, this variant covers a wide range of topics including Experience, Skills, Aging, Salaries, Price Lists, The Referee’s Role, Chain of Command, and World Generation.”

The author's influences were stated up-front: Paramount's Star Trek: The Original Series, Star Trek: The Animated Series, and Franz Joseph's Star Fleet Technical Manual. Crabaugh stated that he did not use Star Trek: The Motion Picture because there was more useful gaming material available in the TV episodes and their novelizations.

== Unofficial adventures ==
“Kirk on Karit 2: A Star Trek Scenario Report” was developed by Emmet F. Milestone for use at DunDraCon IV. The intended players were a mix of “old dungeon-mates” and some non-gamer Trekkies who were interested in finding out about role-playing.

Emmet F. Milestone played the out the game scenario with miniature figures, since their visual appeal added so much vitality. He wrote: “I could only afford a couple of packages of Federation figures and an equal number of Klingons at the time, so I pulled some Star Guard miniatures from my shelves and an idea for the scenario began to crystallize. ... My attention wandered across to a horde of Dreenoi. What could be heavier than swarms of the all devouring insect warriors? I got busy writing stats.”

Emmet F. Milestone provided the details of how he constructed the scenario using an old dungeon map (not provided in the article), the Star Trek Blueprints, and the statistics he devised for the Star Guard Dreenoi.

In addition to the scenario, Emmet F. Milestone also added some romance rules.

== Related material ==
Different Worlds #18 included an article under its "Metal Marvels" section entitled "Star Trek Figures from Citadel" by John T. Sapienza, Jr. This three page review included pictures of the miniatures and included a footnote by Yurek Chodak (assistant editor) stating "We have learned that both Heritage's Star Trek: Adventure Gaming in the Final Frontier role-playing game and the Citadel line of Star Trek figures have been discontinued."

White Dwarf #18 (April/May 1980) included an article entitled "Star Trek- The Motion Picture: Miniature Rules and Scenarios" by Tony Yates and Steve Jackson. Although not directly affiliated with Heritage Model's Star Trek: Adventure Gaming in the Final Frontier, the rules, adventure, and painting guide revolved around the use of Citadel Miniatures, Ltd. Star Trek- The Motion Picture miniatures.

== Reception ==
Jerry Conner reviewed Star Trek: Adventure Gaming in the Final Frontier in The Space Gamer No. 30. Conner commented that "The game is fair, but only recommended to Star Trek fans with a background in role-playing games. Both are necessary for a complete understanding and appreciation of the game."

== See also ==
- Starfleet Voyages
