= IT Grade =

Code system for tolerances on linear dimensions

Note: in this context, IT does not mean Information Technology, but it is an Engineering term.

An IT grade is an internationally accepted code system for tolerances on linear dimensions. Such code systems may be used to produce interchangeable parts. In engineering, the word tolerance refers to a range of allowable dimensions or values. Standard tolerance grades are a group of tolerances for linear sizes characterized by a common identifier. For SI measurements, a system of tolerance grades defined in ISO 286 is frequently used and identified by the letters IT followed by a number specifying how precise the requirements are, relative to the nominal size of a part.

For example, IT14 refers to a group of tolerances used in manufacturing. For a part dimensioned at 10 mm, IT14 allows for up to 0.36 mm of variation in size. As the IT grade number increases, the tolerances increase; similarly, for larger nominal sizes, the standard tolerances increase. For a part dimensioned at 100 mm, IT14 allows for up to 0.87 mm of variation in size.

== Definition ==
The ISO 286 defines the international tolerances grades for nominal sizes up to 3.15 meters as follows:

ISO 286 - Table 1
Nominal size		International tolerance grade																															
>	≤	IT01		IT0		IT1		IT2		IT3		IT4	IT5	IT6	IT7	IT8	IT9	IT10	IT11	IT12		IT13		IT14		IT15		IT16		IT17		IT18	
mm		tolerance in μm																		tolerance in mm													
0	3	0	.3	0	.5	0	.8	1	.2	2	.0	3	4	6	10	14	25	40	60	0	.10	0	.14	0	.25	0	.40	0	.60	1	.00	1	.40
3	6	0	.4	0	.6	1	.0	1	.5	2	.5	4	5	8	12	18	30	48	75	0	.12	0	.18	0	.30	0	.48	0	.75	1	.20	1	.80
6	10	0	.4	0	.6	1	.0	1	.5	2	.5	4	6	9	15	22	36	58	90	0	.15	0	.22	0	.36	0	.58	0	.90	1	.50	2	.20
10	18	0	.5	0	.8	1	.2	2	.0	3		5	8	11	18	27	43	70	110	0	.18	0	.27	0	.43	0	.70	1	.10	1	.80	2	.70
18	30	0	.6	1	.0	1	.5	2	.5	4		6	9	13	21	33	52	84	130	0	.21	0	.33	0	.52	0	.84	1	.30	2	.10	3	.30
30	50	0	.6	1	.0	1	.5	2	.5	4		7	11	16	25	39	62	100	160	0	.25	0	.39	0	.62	1	.00	1	.60	2	.50	3	.90
50	80	0	.8	1	.2	2	.0	3		5		8	13	19	30	46	74	120	190	0	.30	0	.46	0	.74	1	.20	1	.90	3	.00	4	.60
80	120	1	.0	1	.5	2	.5	4		6		10	15	22	35	54	87	140	220	0	.35	0	.54	0	.87	1	.40	2	.20	3	.50	5	.40
120	180	1	.2	2		3	.5	5		8		12	18	25	40	63	100	160	250	0	.40	0	.63	1	.00	1	.60	2	.50	4	.00	6	.30
180	250	2	.0	3		4	.5	7		10		14	20	29	46	72	115	185	290	0	.46	0	.72	1	.15	1	.85	2	.90	4	.60	7	.20
250	315	2	.5	4		6		8		12		16	23	32	52	81	130	210	320	0	.52	0	.81	1	.30	2	.10	3	.20	5	.20	8	.10
315	400	3		5		7		9		13		18	25	36	57	89	140	230	360	0	.57	0	.89	1	.40	2	.30	3	.60	5	.70	8	.90
400	500	4		6		8		10		15		20	27	40	63	97	155	250	400	0	.63	0	.97	1	.55	2	.50	4	.00	6	.30	9	.70
500	630					9		11		16		22	32	44	70	110	175	280	440	0	.70	1	.10	1	.75	2	.80	4	.40	7	.00	11	.00
630	800					10		13		18		25	36	50	80	125	200	320	500	0	.80	1	.25	2	.00	3	.20	5	.00	8	.00	12	.50
800	1,000					11		15		21		28	40	56	90	140	230	360	560	0	.90	1	.40	2	.30	3	.60	5	.60	9	.00	14	.00
1,000	1,250					13		18		24		33	47	66	105	165	260	420	660	1	.05	1	.65	2	.60	4	.20	6	.60	10	.50	16	.50
1,250	1,600					15		21		29		39	55	78	125	195	310	500	780	1	.25	1	.95	3	.10	5	.00	7	.80	12	.50	19	.50
1,600	2,000					18		25		35		46	65	92	150	230	370	600	920	1	.50	2	.30	3	.70	6	.00	9	.20	15	.00	23	.00
2,000	2,500					22		30		41		55	78	110	175	280	440	700	1,100	1	.75	2	.80	4	.40	7	.00	11	.00	17	.50	28	.00
2,500	3,150					26		36		50		68	96	135	210	330	540	860	1,350	2	.10	3	.30	5	.40	8	.60	13	.50	21	.00	33	.00

From IT6 to IT18, the standard tolerances are multiplied by the factor 10 at each fifth step. This rule applies to all standard tolerances and may be used to extrapolate values for IT grades not given in Table 1. For example, the nominal size range 120 mm up to and including 180 mm, the value of IT20 is:

   IT20 = IT15 × 10 = 1.6 mm × 10 = 16 mm [2]

IT grades may be used with alternate prefixes which identify how the tolerance limits are distributed around a nominal value. When used with the IT prefix, IT grades do not specify how the tolerance limits are placed around the nominal value, alternate prefixes are used for this purpose. For example, if the tolerance limits are distributed symmetrically above and below the nominal value, the prefix "js" may be used. For example a part dimensioned (in millimeters) as 4 js7 is equivalent to 4 ± 0.006 (where 4 IT7 is 0.012.)

Other standardized prefixes include the letters A, B, C, CD, D, E, EF, F, G, H, J, K, M, N, P, R, S, T, U, V, X, Y, Z, ZA, ZB, ZC (for holes), and the lower-case equivalents (for shafts.) Prefix letters I, L, O, Q and W are not used to avoid confusion. Of these, the letter prefixes H and h are easiest to explain as the tolerance lies entirely on one side of the nominal size. A hole dimensioned at 4 H7 may range from 4.00 - 4.012 mm, and a shaft at 4 h7 may range from 3.988 - 4.00 mm.

== Preferred tolerance classes and fits ==
ISO 286 identifies a set of preferred tolerance classes for holes which include G7, H7, JS7, K7, N7, P7, R7, S7, F8, H8, E9, H9, D10, A11, B11, C11, and H11. The set of preferred tolerance classes for shafts includes g6, h6, js6, k6, n6, p6, r6, s6, f7, h7, e8, d9, h9, a11, b11, c11 and h11.

To completely specify the fit between a hole and corresponding shaft, it is common to specify a pair of the above tolerance classes, for example H7/g6. As with all IT grades, the smaller numbers correspond to tighter tolerances. Under normal circumstances, only a small number of the possible fits are practically required, and ISO 286 identifies preferred fit combinations including these as most preferred:

- Hole-basis system of fits
  Basic hole	Tolerance classes for shafts		
  Basic hole	Clearance fits	Transition fits	Interference fits
  H7/	g6 h6	js6 k6 m6 n6	p6 r6 s6
  H8/	f7 h7 e8		
  H9/	e8		
  H11/	b11 c11		
- Shaft-basis system of fits
  Basic shaft	Tolerance classes for holes		
  Basic shaft	Clearance fits	Transition fits	Interference fits
  h6	G7 H7	JS7 K7 N7	P7 R7 S7
  h7	F8 H8		
  h9	F8 H8; E9 H9; D10; B11		

== Other uses ==
An industrial process may have an IT grade associated with it, indicating how precise it is. When designing a part, an engineer will typically determine a critical dimension (D) and some tolerance (T) on that dimension. Using this formula, the engineer can determine what IT Grade is necessary to produce the part with those specifications. Thus, if injection molding is capable of IT13 and a part requires IT5, one cannot use injection molding to produce that part to those specifications. It is useful in determining the processes capable of producing parts to a specification.

== See also ==
- Manufacturing
- Interference fit
- Process capability
