= Quest (board game) =

Board game

Quest is a 1978 board game published by Heritage Models under the name of Gametime Games.

== Gameplay ==
Quest is a game in which the Knights of the Round Table go forth from Camelot on quests.

== Reception ==
Norman S. Howe reviewed Quest in The Space Gamer No. 22. Howe commented that "Quest is Dungeon taken outdoors. For so simple a game, it is surprisingly true to the Arthurian legend."
