= Swords & Sorcery (board game) =

Board game

Cover art by Tim Kirk, 1978

Swords & Sorcery, subtitled "Quest and Conquest in the Age of Magic", is a fantasy-themed board wargame published by Simulations Publications, Inc. (SPI) in 1978.

== Description ==
Swords & Sorcery is a fantasy game that includes both a traditional wargame called the Army game, as well as a Quest game involving individual characters. Both use a hex grid map and combat rules usually associated with military-themed wargames. The map's geographical locations are light-hearted puns such as Evelyn Woods, and the Stream of Consciousness. Characters likewise have amusing names such as "Logarithm Son of Algorithm."

=== Components ===
The game box includes:

- 22" x 34" paper hex grid map
- 56-page Rulebook
- 56 cards (40 characters, 10 item, 6 monsters)
- 400 die-cut counters
- Errata sheet dated December 1978
- two sets of Charts & Tables
- Diplomacy/solar/personal combat display
- two 6-sided dice

=== Army game ===
In the Army game, 2–6 players control armies of counters using traditional wargame rules of movement and combat, including zones of control and a combat results table (CRT). However, magical spells add a new element to the game. There are fourteen scenarios that have various victory conditions, generally elimination of enemy troops, conquering certain locations or defending certain locations.

=== Quest game ===
In the Quest game, which lasts twelve turns, 3–24 players each have one character that maneuvers on the same map as the Army game to fulfil quests. Some player become Questors, seeking to fulfill quests, and the balance of players defend the objects being sought. Each game sets out a number of quests equal to half the number of players. Questors gain victory points for each quest that is completed, and lose some of those if they are slain. Defenders gain victory points for killing Questors.

== Publication history ==
With the sudden rise in the mid- and late 1970s of fantasy role-playing games such as Dungeons & Dragons and RuneQuest, wargaming publisher SPI decided to enter the fantasy game market, and the result was Swords & Sorcery, a fantasy-themed wargame designed by Greg Costikyan and developed by Eric Goldberg. Redmond A. Simonsen provided the graphical design, with artwork by Tim Kirk. After publication in 1978, Swords & Sorcery rose to No. 1 on SPI's Top Ten Bestseller List, and stayed on the list for the next year. An expansion was proposed for the game but it did not make the production queue.

== Reception ==
Issue 19 of The Space Gamer featured two reviews of Swords & Sorcery. In the first, David J. Butler noted that the counters needed in some scenarios were not available, and there were some errors and ambiguities in some scenario setups. Butler also noted several ambiguities in the rules that needed to be addressed. Despite these issues, he concluded with a strong recommendation, saying, "this game must be considered a superior addition to any fantasy gamer's collection. Quest and scenario creations and the introduction of characters from other campaigns should keep this game alive a long time." David J. Ritchie vehemently disagreed, saying "it would seem that fantasy gaming has taken another step backward." Ritchie argued that the game fails because it tries to be everything to everyone, noting, "the designers seem lost in the mass of their material and the game lacks any believable rationale upon which to hang itself." He concluded with a strong recommendation NOT to buy, saying, "Beyond playing around with the genre, nothing else seems to have struck the designers as important. [...] The resulting disaster is understandable, if not forgivable."

David Ritchie reviewed Swords and Sorcery in Ares Magazine No. 1, and gave it a below-average rating of 6 out of 9, saying "The game is presented in a series of scenarios and adventures rather than a massive campaign game, which is just as well since the wealth of information presented is almost too much to handle in a lump. Quite complex. The average scenario takes about three hours to play. If you can get past the truly awful puns, it's worth more than a few replays.".

In Issue 22 of Phoenix, John and Deidre Evans found a number of troubling omissions and ambiguities in the rules, but despite this, concluded, "Swords and Sorcery represents an important and considerable step forward in the development of fantasy board wargaming and we are glad to have it in our games collection."

In the 1980 book The Complete Book of Wargames, game designer Jon Freeman commented that "it is not intended, even vaguely, to be a serious game ... This is as much a toy as a game. It is an enormous joke, and one you're invited to join in." Freeman gave this game an Overall Evaluation of "Good", concluding, "A bit of restraint all around would have helped make this a better and more coherent game and one more acceptable to the majority of gamers, but if you enjoy the designers' brand of humor, you'll have a lot of fun with this."

In a retrospective review in Issue 9 of Simulacrum, Mark Wegierski noted that "SPI was trying to appeal to a large element of the most stereotypical D&D mentality when it chose to make the background of its S&S game a thoroughly ridiculous world ... In any event, the game probably looked too complicated to attract the average D&Der into playing it, while most historical gamers had no interest in it."

In another retrospective review of Swords & Sorcery in Black Gate, John ONeill said "Swords and Sorcery was created by legendary game designer Greg Costikyan relatively early in his career. While it's clearly a product of its time — owing a huge debt to Tolkien for, well, just about everything, including the race histories and the entire story structure — it also has enough original touches to give the game a distinct flavor."

== Awards ==
At the 1979 Origins Awards, Swords & Sorcery was a finalist for the Charles S. Roberts Award for "Best Fantasy / Futuristic Board Game of 1978."

== Other reviews and commentary ==
- Fire & Movement #16
- Campaign #91
- Perfidious Albion #39 (May 1979) p.8
