= Battle-Sphere =

Board game

Battle-Sphere is a 2-player science fiction combat board game that was published by Sten Productions in 1978.

== Gameplay ==
Battle-Sphere is a game which involves a group of rebel ships assaulting an imperial Battle-Sphere that is stranded and defenseless without a necessary component. The Imperial player tries to deliver the missing component; the rebel player tries to either destroy the Battle-Sphere before it is operational again, or destroy the ship that is delivering the component. If the Imperial player is able to repair the Battle-Sphere, its powerful armament will usually overwhelm the rebels.

=== Components ===
The game comes with the following components:

- 18" x 14" map
- game rules
- fictional explanatory notes
- cardboard counters for the rebel and Imperial ships

=== Victory conditions ===
The player with the most victory points at the end of the game is the winner:

- Imperial Battle-Sphere is worth 7 points (awarded to Imperial player if it survives, to the Rebel player if it is destroyed)
- Rebel captain is worth 3 points (awarded to the Imperial player if the captain dies, to the Rebel player if the captain survives)

== Reception ==
In the June 1979 edition of Dragon (Issue #26), Tony Watson called Battle-Sphere "a fairly clever, if simple, game. It is ideal for an evening of easy gaming, but still requires enough thought to make it all interesting."
