= Sony HiFD =

High capacity floppy disk system

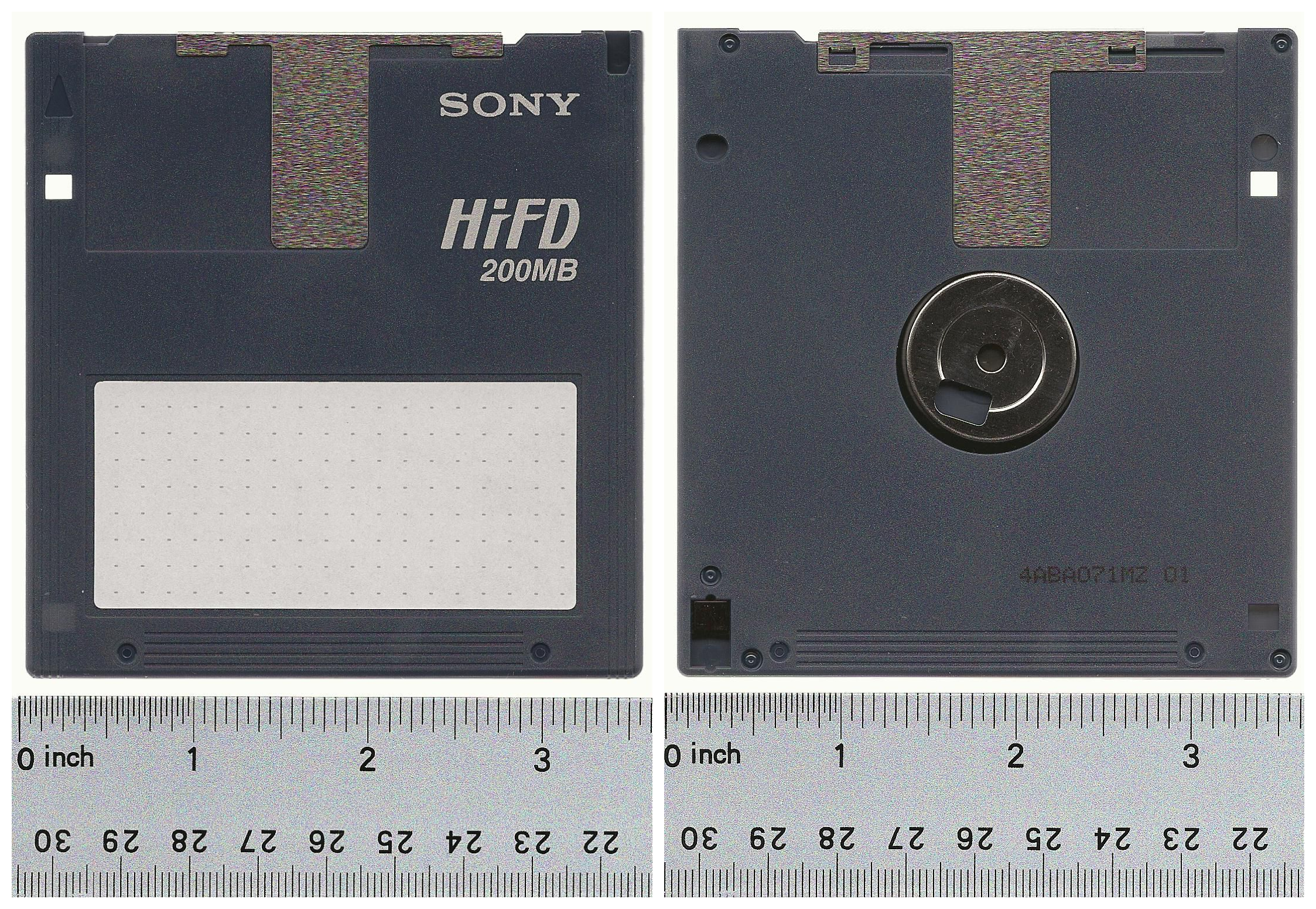
- A Sony HiFD drive, with the front and back side by side and a ruler for a size comparison
- Media type: High-capacity floppy disk
- Capacity: 200MB
- Developed by: Sony
- Manufactured by: Sony
- Released: 1998
- Discontinued: 2001

The Sony HiFD (High capacity Floppy Disk) was a high-capacity floppy disk system developed by Sony and Fujifilm and introduced in late 1998. Development and sale of the drives was discontinued by early 2001.

Announced in October 1997, HiFD disks offered a capacity of 200 MB while maintaining backwards compatibility with standard 720 KB and 1.44 MB diskettes. Sony initially planned to begin shipping the drives in the first half of 1998, however, the introduction was delayed until the end of the year. TEAC and Alps also planned to introduce HiFD drives. The first drives to reach the public were external parallel port models priced at $199. An internal ATA version was later offered, with a SCSI version planned but never launched. IBM offered an internal HiFD drive as an option on some of its workstations in 2000.

Its immediate competitors were the popular Iomega Zip drive, which had a capacity of 100 MB and Imation's Laser-Servo LS-120 SuperDisk, which had a capacity of 120 MB and like HiFD was also compatible with existing floppy disk formats. Many observers confidently predicted that the HiFD would swiftly take over the market, and ultimately replace the floppy drive.

This did not happen, however. A few months after launch it emerged that the HiFD suffered from frequent crashes during read/write operations, and had a tendency of having its read rate drop into the low kilobyte per second range, effectively rendering it unusable. Initially it was thought that a new driver could solve these problems – instead, Sony issued a full recall at the start of the following year.

The HiFD was re-released in November 1999, using a USB connection for the external drive. The whole affair gave the HiFD a reputation for being unreliable, and by this time the Zip drive now sported a 250 MB capacity and CD-RW drives were entering the mainstream. These factors doomed the second HiFD to failure.

== See also ==
- SuperDisk (LS-120, LS-240)
- Zip drive (ZIP-100, ZIP-250, ZIP-750)
- Caleb UHD144
- Floppy disk
