= Dawn of the Dead (game) =

Board game

- Cover art by John H. Butterfield
- Designers: John Butterfield
- Illustrators: John Butterfield, Redmond A. Simonsen
- Publishers: Simulations Publications Inc.
- Publication: 1981
- Genres: Zombie apocalypse

Dawn of the Dead is a science fiction board wargame published by Simulations Publications, Inc. (SPI) in 1981 that is based on the zombie film first released in 1978, Dawn of the Dead.

== Gameplay ==
Dawn of the Dead is a two-player game set in a shopping mall on the day after a zombie apocalypse. One player controls four humans — two SWAT team members armed with M16 rifles and a man and woman armed with pistols — trapped in the mall and surrounded by zombies. The other player controls the zombies that try to either kill the humans, or infect them, causing the humans to become zombies themselves.

The humans start in different areas of the mall and must first link up in order to survive. Their advantages in combat are their relatively high speed and their firearms. Zombies move slowly and have less combat ability, but can go berserk, which increases their combat strength; this may cause one or more of the humans to panic, ending the panicked character's weapon fire for the rest of the turn. The zombie player can also "hide" up to five zombies to ambush unwary humans.

The game comes with a rulebook, an 11" x 17" map of the mall, and counters representing four humans and fifty zombies. The rules also include a solitaire game.

=== Victory conditions ===
The human player wins if the human team can arm the civilians with hunting rifles, lock all the mall doors to prevent new zombies from entering, and then kill all the zombies left in the mall.

The zombie player wins if three of the humans are killed or infected; this requirement is reduced to only two humans if one of the victims is the woman.

== Publication history ==
In 1980, SPI was one of the two largest wargame publishers in North America, but the wargame market abruptly began to soften, and SPI tried to pivot to licensed board games. They first produced The Big Red One, a licensed game based on the movie of the same name. The Dallas role-playing game, based on the popular television series, was much less successful. In 1981, SPI tried again, acquiring the board game license for the film Dawn of the Dead. John Butterfield designed the game as well as the box cover art, and it was released by SPI in 1981.

== Reception ==
In the June 1981 edition of The Space Gamer (Issue No. 40), Steve Jackson questioned the game balance, which seemed to favor the human player, both in terms of enjoyment and in winning the game: "Dawn of the Dead would be worth the money to somebody who liked the movie. It also plays much better as a solitaire; in a two-player game, the zombie player will feel like a zombie himself before the game is over. If zombie movement had been slightly higher, or if normal zombies had been allowed to stack, it could have been more interesting and better balanced. As is ... pretty counters, but nice try."

In the December 1981 edition of Dragon (Issue 56), Tony Watson also found the game tilted in the humans' favor: "The game is fast-paced and a fair amount of fun, despite its decidedly macabre nature. It is definitely more fun for the human player, who can run around and blast away at the hapless monsters. The zombie player has to win early, while he has the humans separated and boxed into a corner. If the humans can link up into pairs and get into the open, they can use their high movement values to run up, zap a couple of zombies, and retreat into relative safety. This perhaps is the game’s greatest flaw."

== Other reviews and commentary ==
- American Wargamer Vol.8, No. 12
- Richard Berg's Review of Games Vol.1 No. 20
