= It (board game) =

It is a 1978 board game published by Attack International.

== Gameplay ==
It is a wargame in which a huge robot tank attacks an outpost defended by a force of smaller units.

== Reception ==
Andy Davis reviewed It in The Space Gamer No. 35. Davis commented that "When I scrutinized It, I considered burning it outright. [...] I have to say that every gamer should stay far, far away from It."
