= Stomp! (game) =

Fantasy tabletop wargame

- Cover by William Church
- Designers: Tadashi Ehara
- Illustrators: Eric Vogt; William Church; Drashi Khendup
- Publishers: Chaosium
- Publication: 1978; 48 years ago
- Genres: Fantasy board wargame

Stomp! is a fantasy board wargame published by Chaosium in 1978 that simulates conflict between a band of elves and a giant over ownership of a garden.

== Description ==
Stomp! is an asymmetrical two-player game in which one player controls Thunderpumper the giant, and the other player controls a band of eighteen elves.

Lord Darn is annoyed by the elves, who are making a mess of his garden while they steal his melons, and orders his giant Thunderpumper to clear the garden of all elves. The giant attempts to do this by either crushing them under his feet or bashing them with his club. The elves in turn try to pin the giant's feet to the ground with their spears so that they can pull him down with ropes.

=== Victory conditions ===
If the elves succeed in toppling the giant onto the garden wall, they can run up his body, and escape, winning the game.

If the giant stomps or smashes all of the elves before this happens, the giant wins.

== Publication history ==
Stomp! was created by Tadashi Ehara, illustrated by Eric Vogt, William Church, and Drashi Khendup, and published by Chaosium in 1978.

== Reception ==
In Issue 21 of The Space Gamer, Phil Kosnett commented "I rather like this game. It's imaginative; it's fast and fun and balanced. The rules are a bit sketchy for a recruit customer to get everything right without being confused, but gamers with any experience at all will have no problem."

In Issue 38 of the British game magazine Perfidious Albion, Charles Vasey noted, "This is not a game for serious bores who like being serious; it's for those who like vicarious violence, stomping on those weaker than themselves —it's greaat!" Vasey concluded, "The idea is original and the finish professional. Things seem very well balanced as well. Yeah Giants."

In the October 1980 issue of Fantastic, game designer Greg Costikyan called Stomp! "one of the most amusing micros on the market ... Highly recommended."
