= Strange New Worlds (board game) =

1978 science fiction board game

- Cover Art by John Hagen
- Publishers: Gametime Games
- Publication: 1978
- Genres: Science fiction
- Players: 2–6

Strange New Worlds is a science fiction board game published by Gametime Games, a division of Heritage Models, in 1978.

== Description ==
Strange New Worlds is a game for 2–6 players where each player travels to new star systems and attempts to colonize planets.

=== Gameplay ===
Each player controls one starship, and may purchase crew cards such as Astro-Marines, Science Officer, and Star Soldier. Only four cards may be on the starship at a time.

=== Movement ===
The starship can hyperjump to another star system, but cannot hyperjump back. Critic Geoffrey Barnard called it "rather like a series of one-way elevators."

=== Colonization ===
When a starship arrives at a new star, the player draws a card to determine what type of planet it is. This can be benign — "Excellent Farming Conditions" — in which case the player can successfully colonize it by leaving a Colonist card behind and paying a bank fee. The colonized planet will now provide income to the player.

However, a planet might require a special type of crew member to colonize it. For example, for a planet without air the player must have in their hand, or be able to purchase, a Science Officer crew card, as well as paying 50 credits in cosmic currency. Another planet with a warrior tradition might require Astro-Marines. If the player does not have the required crew card and cannot purchase it, the starship must leave the system with the planet uncolonized.

=== Combat ===
One player can attack another player's colony, attempting to conquer it. If the attacking player has the correct crew card needed, and it has a greater value than the crew card currently on the planet, the conquest is successful, and ownership is passed to the attacker.

=== Victory conditions ===
The first player to colonize seven planets is the winner.

== Publication history ==
Gametime Games, a division of Heritage Models, published this game as a boxed set in 1978 with cover art by John Hagen.

== Reception ==
In Issue 32 of the British wargaming magazine Perfidious Albion, Charles Vasey and Geoffrey Barnard discussed the game. Vasey commented, "This game is deceptively simple but has some lovely design features. The jump-routes are excellent and make for great fun as players realise they cannot go back the way they came." The only issue Vasey had with the game was constantly having to change cash into different denominations. Barnard replied, "The game is intended for up to six players, the full set would encourage masses of conflict and rivalry, but the game works just as well for two player." Vasey concluded, "The board is a little drab, the money counters are a little hard to read, but the cards are excellent. Just right for the multi-player convention game with room for plenty of dirty tricks." Barnard concluded, "You have to try to leave every colony self-supporting — and that applies especially to your home world. If you are left without any Colonists on your ship, and your opponents capture all your colonies, you're stuck, left to wither."

In Issue 24 of The Space Gamer, Norman S. Howe commented that "It's a fascinating, exciting game with overtones of Star Trek and the best space operas. I have not seen a better game this year."

In Issue 15 of Galileo, Marvin Kaye commented, "There is considerable opportunity for skillful play and a fair amount of luck, too. The game pieces, though mostly cardboard, are attractively designed." However, Kaye did find that "the instructions are too brief and fail to detail all the circumstances that may occur in a game. Also, the contest goes on rather too long when it is played by few; it is much more lively when the maximum half-dozen competitors vie for Empire."
