= I.T =

Hong Kong fashion company

I. T Limited
- Company type: Private
- Industry: Conglomerate; Fashion; Investment
- Founded: November 1988; 37 years ago in Hong Kong
- Founders: Sham Kar Wai; Sham Kin Wai
- Headquarters: Wong Chuk Hang, Hong Kong
- Area served: Worldwide
- Key people: Sham Kar Wai (Chairman & CEO); Sham Kin Wai (CCO)
- Website: www.ithk.com

I.T is a Hong Kong fashion and investment conglomerate founded in November 1988. It owns a number of Hong Kong brands which it retails as well as distributing European and Japanese brands such as French Connection and A Bathing Ape. It has a large presence in Asia and several stores in a single mall in Richmond, British Columbia (in Canada closed in 2019).

Its head office is on the 31st floor of Tower A of Southmark (南滙廣場) in Wong Chuk Hang, while its registered office is in Hamilton, Bermuda.

== History ==
I.T started in November 1988 by brothers, Sham Kar Wai and Sham Kin Wai, as a distributor of "hard to find" labels in Hong Kong, but more recently developed its own fashion brands.

== Stores ==
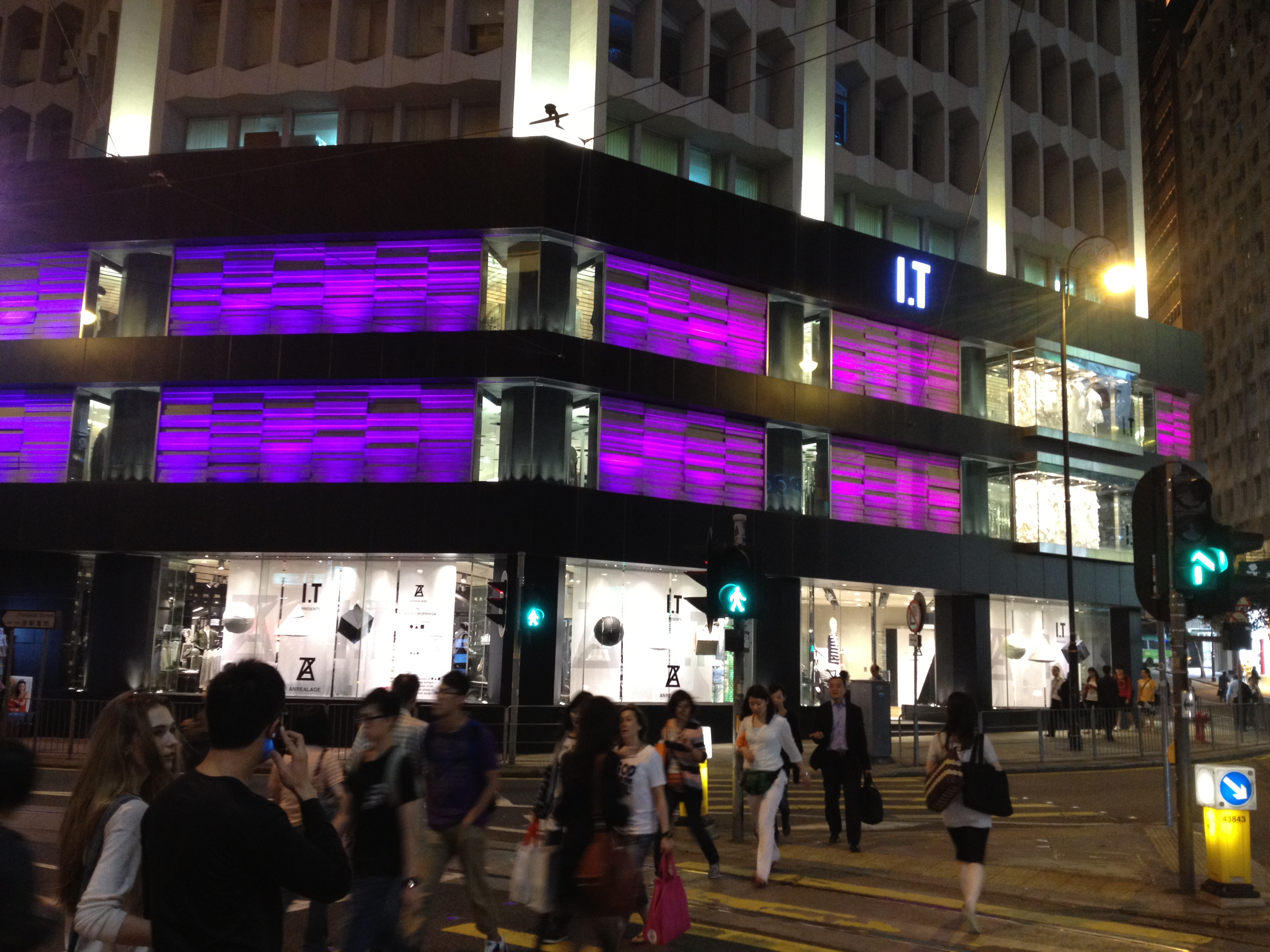
I.T store in Causeway Bay, Hong Kong

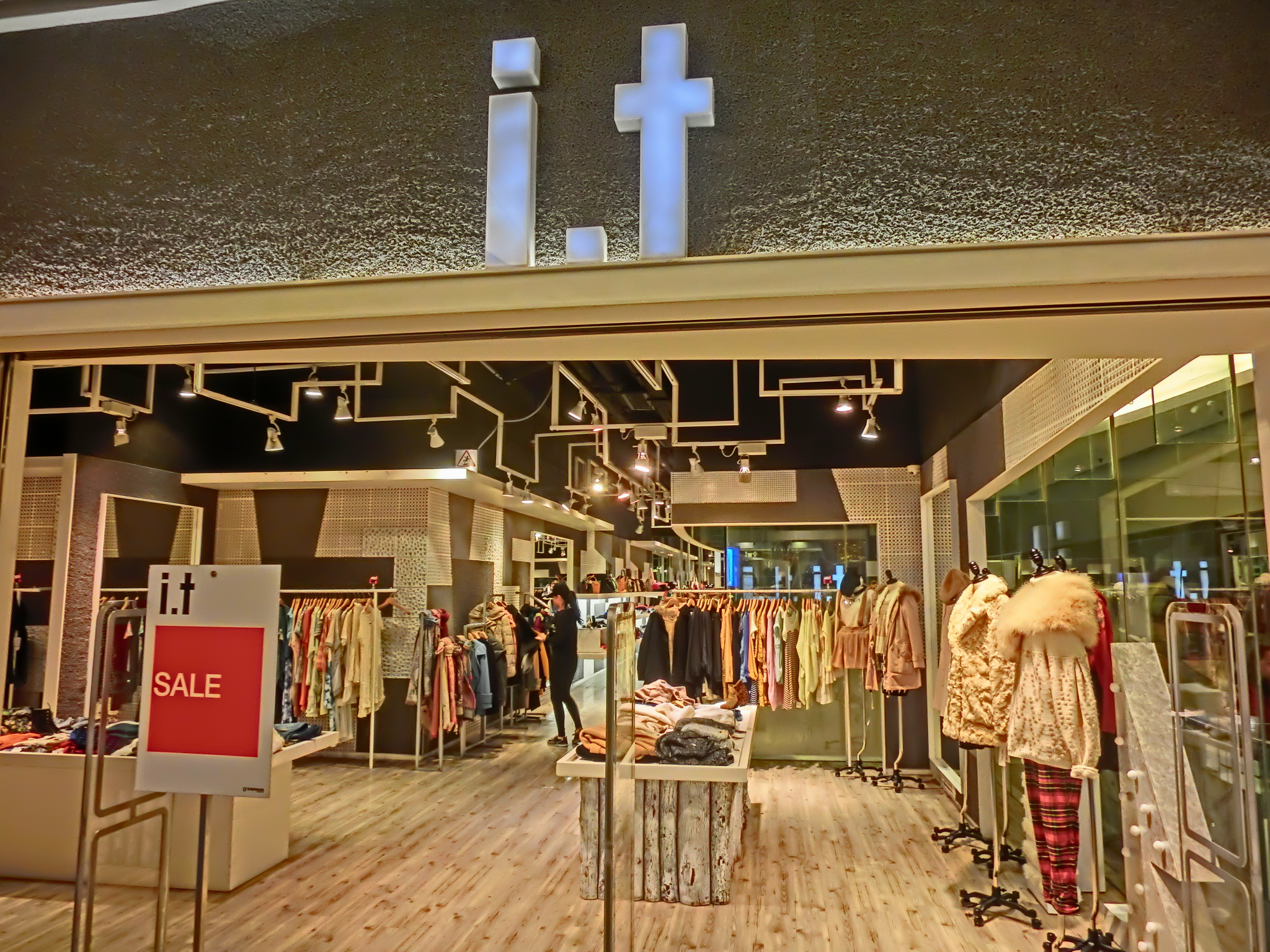
i.t store in apm Shopping mall in Kwun Tong, Hong Kong

I.T operates stores under the name "I.T" for distributing more expensive, Japanese and European brands, and "i.t" which distributes all other youthful brands under its name, and also operates individual stores for its sub-brands, such as 5CM.

== Brands owned ==
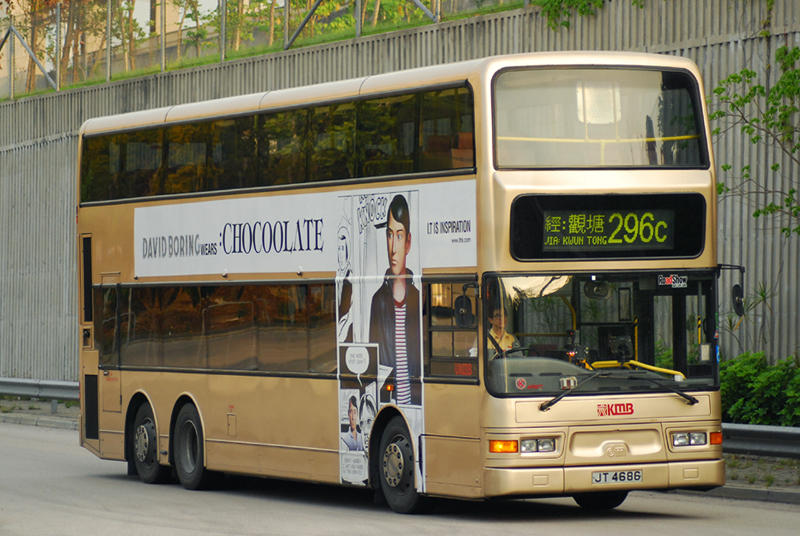
An I.T company advertisement on a bus exterior

In-house brands

- AAPE BY A BATHING APE®
- A BATHING APE®
- A BATHING APE® Café
- b+ab
- CHOCOOLATE
- EXIT
- FIVE CM
- fingercroxx
- FRED PERRY
- HOODS
- izzue
- IT ASSORTED MUSIUM DIV.
- mastermind A BATHING APE®
- NEITH
- tout à coup
- Venilla suite

Licensed brands

- X-Large
- Hyoma
- as known as de Rue
- Camper
- MLB
- Techwear
