= Caleb UHD144 =

High capacity floppy disk system

Caleb UHD144 and disks

The Caleb Technology UHD144 (Ultra High Density) is a floptical-based 144 MB floppy disk system introduced in early 1998, marketed as the it drive. Like other floptical-like systems, the UHD144 can read and write standard 720 KB and 1.44 MB 3½-inch disks as well. Its main advantage over similar devices like the SuperDisk was the low cost of the media, which averaged about $5 shortly after introduction.

The company went bankrupt in early 2002.

== See also ==
- SuperDisk
- Sony HiFD
- Zip drive
- Floppy disk
