= Hybrid array =

A hybrid array is a form of hierarchical storage management that combines hard disk drives (HDDs) with solid-state drives (SSDs) for I/O speed improvements.

Hybrid storage arrays aim to mitigate the ever increasing price-performance gap between HDDs and DRAM by adding a non-volatile flash level to the memory hierarchy. Hybrid arrays thus aim to lower the cost per I/O, compared to using only SSDs for storage. Hybrid architectures can be as simple as involving a single SSD cache for desktop or laptop computers, or can be more complex as configurations for data centers and cloud computing.

== Implementations ==
Some commercial products for building hybrid arrays include:

- Adaptec demonstrated the MaxIQ series in 2009.
- Apple's Fusion Drive
- Linux software includes bcache, dm-cache, and Flashcache (and its fork EnhanceIO).
- Condusive's ExpressCache is marketed for laptops.
- EMC Corporation VFcache was announced in 2012.
- Fusion-io acquired ioTurbine in 2011, and the product line it acquired by buying NexGen in 2013.
- Hitachi Accelerated Flash Storage (HAFS) used together with the Hitachi Dynamic Tiering software
- IBM Flash Cache Storage Accelerator (FCSA) server software
- Intel's Smart Response Technology for desktop
- Intel's Cache Acceleration Software for servers and workstations
- LSI CacheCade software for their controllers
- Marvell's HyperDuo controllers
- Microsoft ReadyBoost allows personal computers to use USB flash drives (or any solid-state media) as cache.
  - Microsoft's Automated Tiering (since Windows 2012 R2)
- NetApp's Flash Cache, Flash Pool, Flash Accel
- Oracle Corporation markets products such as Exadata Smart Cache Flash, and the FS1 flash storage system.
- Nvelo DataPlex SSD caching software was announced in 2011, and was acquired by Samsung in 2012.
- SanDisk FlashSoft for Windows, Linux, and vSphere
- Products are offered by vendors like AMI StorTrends, Tegile Systems, Reduxio, and Tintri.
- ZFS using hybrid storage pools, are used for example in some Oracle Corporation products.

== See also ==
- Hybrid drive – built-in flash cache, handled by firmware
- Automated tiered storage – another name for hierarchical storage management
- The "five-minute rule" for caching
