= ExpressCache =

Windows-based SSD caching technology

ExpressCache is a Windows-based SSD caching technology developed by Condusiv Technologies and licensed to a number of laptop manufacturers including Acer, ASUS, Samsung, Sony, Lenovo, and Fujitsu. ExpressCache is also bundled with some SanDisk products such as ReadyCache; SanDisk currently holds an exclusive ExpressCache license for stand-alone storage products.

A test by PC Pro of the 2011-launched Samsung 700Z, which included an 8 GB SSD and a 7200 rpm hard drive, showed a reduction of five seconds in boot time with Windows 7, when ExpressCache was enabled. Another vendor's demo at Computex 2011, involving a laptop also equipped with an 8 GB SSD, showed a boot-time reduction of about ten seconds.

A test by CDRLabs of a stand-alone 32 GB SanDisk ReadyCache product, which was added to a quad-core desktop (Core i5-2400 CPU) equipped with a 7200 rpm hard drive, found a reduction in boot time from 25 down to 14 seconds, but found no significant improvements in random read/write tests. Another similar test of a 32 GB ReadyCache product, conducted by HardOCP, found a reduction in boot time from 52 down to 13 seconds. Yet another test by Expert Reviews found a boot time reduction from 48 down to 35 seconds.

A criticism against ExpressCache in PC Pro was that it "isn't very configurable. You can't, for instance, install an application of your choosing there." PC World France noted that the ExpressCache software bundled with ReadyCache has a limit of three computers on which it can be activated; their reviewer also expressed dismay at SanDisk's choice of using MLC flash on a caching product.

== See also ==
- bcache, dm-cache, and EnhanceIO on Linux
- Apple's Fusion Drive
- Hybrid array
- Hybrid drive
- Intel Smart Response Technology and Intel Turbo Memory
- Microsoft ReadyDrive and ReadyBoost
