= IdeaCentre A series =

Desktop PCs

Lenovo's IdeaCentre A Series is a line of all-in-one desktops designed primarily for home use and the consumer PC segment. The sections below describe the IdeaCentre A Series desktops, categorized by their year of release.

== 2014 ==
=== A740 ===
Lenovo released the IdeaCentre A740 in 2014. The A740 is an all-in-one desktop computer with a 27-inch touchscreen supporting 10-finger multitouch. The top-of-the line version has a WQHD resolution (2560x1440) and comes with the Intel Core i7-4558U quad-core (low-voltage) processor and an NVIDIA GeForce GTX 850M graphics card in addition to the internal Intel HD graphics processor. The 1 TB harddrive is a Solid State Hybrid Drive which includes an 8 GB SSD.

== 2013 ==
=== A730 ===
Lenovo released the IdeaCentre A730 in 2013. The A730 is an all-in-one desktop computer with a 27-inch touchscreen, and an NVIDIA GeForce GT 745M graphics card.

== 2012 ==
=== A720 ===
Lenovo released the IdeaCentre A720 in 2012. The A720 is an all-in-one desktop computer with a 27-inch touchscreen.

== 2011 ==
The ThinkCentre A Series desktops released by Lenovo in 2011 were the A700 and the A320.

=== A700 ===
Released in March 2011, the A700 all-in-one desktop was equipped with an Intel i-720QM 1.60 GHz processor, 8 GB DDR3 SDRAM, a 23-inch display with a maximum resolution of 1920x1080 and multitouch features, 1 TB SATA II 7200 RPM hard disk drive, and AMD ATI Mobility Radeon HD 5650 discrete graphics. The A700 also came with Dolby stereo sound and JBL speakers, had dimensions of 16.9 x 22.4 x 2.8 inches and weighed 32.6 pounds. The pros of the desktop were listed as the large screen with multi-touch capabilities, the TV tuner and the HDMI IN port. The cons were listed as the ‘quirky’ touchscreen and the speakers.

=== A320 ===
The A320 was the successor to the A310 and Lenovo's slimmest AIO at the time. The desktop was 18 mm thick at its thinnest point. The desktop also offered a 1080p 21.5 inch display, options for an Intel Core i3 or Core i5 Sandy Bridge processor. Other specifications on the desktop included up to 8 GB of RAM, a 750 GB hard disk drive, and a built-in TV tuner. Users could watch TV without booting the operating system.

== 2010 ==
The IdeaCentre A Series desktops released in 2010 were the A300 and the A310.

=== A300 ===
Released in June 2010, the IdeaCentre A300 desktop was described by Engadget as “gorgeous” and “attention-grabbing”. The desktop included an Intel Core 2 Duo T6600 processor, 4 GB of DDR3 memory, a 500 GB hard disk drive, Intel GMA X4500 integrated HD graphics. The desktop was described by PCMag as being appropriate for digital entertainment requirements (like movies and audio) but not 3D games. The desktop did not include an optical drive, or a remote for the Media Center and TV features. The IdeaCentre A310 was awarded four of five stars by PCMag.

=== A310 ===
Released in November 2010, the IdeaCentre A310 desktop represented an update to the A300. The chassis was the same as the A300, with a slim screen and components contained in the base. To compensate for the lack of a built-in optical drive, an external optical drive was included with the desktop. However, the external optical drive did not support reading/writing Blu-ray discs. Also, unlike the A300, a remote was included for the ATSC/HDTV tuner. The IR receiver was not built into the AIO, however, and required a USB dongle to function correctly.

== 2009 ==
The IdeaCentre A Series desktop released in 2009 was the A600.

=== A600 ===
The first desktop in Lenovo's IdeaCentre A Series was the A600. It was an all-in-one (AIO). Engadget indicated that the launch was expected in late March or early April 2009, since the AIOs were made available for orders on Lenovo's Web site on March 25, 2009. However, the actual launch occurred in May 2009. Engadget reported that different reviewers agreed on the fact that the desktop offered good value for its price. Two features indicated to be especially good value were the TV tuner and the remote that could be used as a controller and a VoIP handset.

In its review of the A600 desktop, PCMag indicated that the desktop was better than large screen notebooks, offering a 16:9 21.5 inch widescreen, with a maximum resolution of 1920x1080. The chassis thickness varied between 1 inch and 2.4 inches – the thickest area was below the screen, which contained the system components. The desktop incorporated processors up to Intel Pentium Core 2 Duo, 3 GB RAM, and Intel GMA 4500MHD integrated graphics.
