= Smart Response Technology =

Proprietary caching mechanism by Intel

In computer data storage, Smart Response Technology (SRT, also called SSD Caching before it was launched) is a proprietary caching mechanism introduced in 2011 by Intel for their Z68 chipset (for the Sandy Bridge–series processors), which allows a SATA solid-state drive (SSD) to function as cache for a (conventional, magnetic) hard disk drive (HDD).

SRT is managed by Intel Rapid Storage Technology software version 10.5 or later, and implemented both in its device driver and in the Z68 motherboard's firmware (option ROM). It is available only when the (integrated) disk controller is configured in RAID mode (but not AHCI or IDE modes) by implementing a style of RAID 0 striping. The user can select write-back (so-called maximized mode) or write-through (so-called enhanced mode) caching strategy. The maximum utilizable cache size on the SSD is 64 GB. Caching is done at the logical block addressing (LBA) level, not the file level.

Shortly before the announcement of the new chipset, Intel also introduced the Intel 311 (Larson Creek), a 20 GB single-level cell (SLC) solid-state drive, which it markets as suitable for caching. Throughout its lifespan, TRIM garbage collection was not supported for SRT caching devices, meaning SSD performance was solely maintained by the drive's own firmware.

With the release of Ivy Bridge chipsets, support for SRT was provided in a larger variety of desktop chipsets, including Z77, Q77, H77 and C216 (but not Z75, Q75 or B75) as long as an "Intel Core Processor" is used. The situation is similar for Haswell desktop chipsets, with Z87, Q87, H87 and C226 listed as supported. The Ivy Bridge-E chipset X79 did not officially support SRT at launch, but some companies like ASRock added support to their boards via BIOS updates. The arrival of Ivy Bridge also saw SRT support added to mobile chipsets: QS77, QM77, UM77 and HM77 support SRT, while HM76 does not.

In 2012, Intel also introduced the 313 (Hawley Creek) caching SSD series (20 and 24 GB), advertised as also suitable for use in ultrabooks.

SRT was limited to using at most 64 GB for caching, meaning that on larger SSDs the remaining space was unused by the cache. The chipset exposes any excess storage space as a separate independent disk, which can be used for other purposes.

In 2014, Intel updated the SRT supported chipset list to include the Intel 9 Series H97 and Z97 chipsets.

The following year, support was not added for succeeding Z170 and H170 Skylake generation chipsets. Intel Optane Memory was released to provide an Intel solution for 16 and 32 GB capacities which caused the discontinuation of SRT support on July 31, 2018. It was announced that Intel Optane Memory would replace SRT starting with Intel RST version 16.x, with the last version to support SRT being 15.9. Intel gave the reason for cutting this technology from the range, is because it “Intel® Optane™ memory delivers increased system performance and responsiveness which supersede the end-user benefits of Intel® Smart Response Technology” The Optane Memory modules were only compatible with 7 th Gen "Kaby Lake" Core i3, i5 and i7 processors with a Z270, Q270, H270, Q250, B250 or C236 chipset. This new SSD caching method left Z170/H170 chips and Skylake processors without any kind of SSD caching available.

== See also ==
- bcache, dm-cache, and Flashcache on Linux
- Apple's Fusion Drive
- Condusiv's ExpressCache
- Hybrid array
- Hybrid drive
- Intel Turbo Memory
- Intel Cache Acceleration Software for enterprise products
- Microsoft ReadyDrive and ReadyBoost
- Intel Rapid Storage Technology
