= Fusion Drive =

Data storage technology

Fusion Drive was a type of hybrid drive technology created by Apple Inc. It combined a hard disk drive with NAND flash storage (a solid-state drive of 24 GB or more) and presented it as a single Core Storage managed logical volume with the space of both drives combined.

The operating system automatically managed the contents of the drive so the most frequently accessed files were stored on the faster flash storage, while infrequently used items moved to or stayed on the hard drive. For example, if spreadsheet software is used often, the software will be moved to the flash storage for faster user access. This logical volume speeds up performance of the computer by performing both caching for faster writes and auto tiering for faster reads.

== Availability ==
The Fusion Drive was announced as part of an Apple event held on October 23, 2012, with the first supporting products being two desktops: the iMac and Mac Mini with OS X Mountain Lion released in late 2012. Fusion Drives were quietly discontinued from Mac models during the transition to Apple Silicon. Support for the Fusion Drive was dropped in macOS Tahoe in 2026.

	Release date	HDD storage	Flash storage
Mac Mini	Late 2012	1 TB	128 GB
Mac Mini	Late 2014	1 TB	128 GB
iMac (all models)	Late 2012	1 TB	128 GB
iMac (all models)	Late 2013	1 TB	128 GB
iMac (all models)	2014	1 TB	128 GB
iMac (27-inch non-Retina)	Late 2012	3 TB	128 GB
iMac (27-inch non-Retina)	Late 2013	3 TB	128 GB
iMac (27-inch Retina)	Late 2014	3 TB	128 GB
iMac (27-inch Retina)	Mid-2015	3 TB	128 GB
iMac	Late 2015	1 TB	24 GB
iMac	Late 2015	2 TB	128 GB
iMac	Mid 2017	1 TB	32 GB
iMac	Mid 2017	2 TB	128 GB
iMac	Mid 2017	3 TB	128 GB
iMac	Early 2019	1 TB	32 GB
iMac	Early 2019	2 TB	128 GB
iMac	Early 2019	3 TB	128 GB

== Design ==
Apple's Fusion Drive design incorporates proprietary features with limited documentation. It has been reported that the design of Fusion Drive has been influenced by a research project called Hystor. According to the paper, this hybrid storage system unifies a high-speed SSD and a large-capacity hard drive, with several design elements used in the Fusion Drive.

1. The SSD and the hard drive are logically merged into a single block device managed by the operating system, which is independent of file systems and requires no changes to applications.
2. A portion of SSD space is used as a write-back buffer to absorb incoming write traffic, which hides perceivable latencies and boosts write performance.
3. More frequently accessed data is stored on the SSD and the larger, less frequently accessed data stored on the HDD.
4. Data movement is based on access patterns: if data has been on the HDD and suddenly becomes frequently accessed, it will usually get moved to the SSD by the program controlling the Fusion Drive. During idle periods, data is adaptively migrated to the most suitable device to provide sustained data processing performance for users.

Several experimental studies have been conducted to speculate about the internal mechanism of Fusion Drive. A number of speculations are available but not completely confirmed.

1. Fusion Drive is a block-level solution based on Apple's Core Storage, a logical volume manager managing multiple physical devices. The capacity of a Fusion Drive is confirmed to be the sum of two devices. Fusion Drive is file system agnostic and effective for both HFS Plus and ZFS.
2. Part of the SSD space is used as a write buffer for incoming writes. In the stable state, a minimum 4 GB space is reserved for buffering writes. A small spare area is set aside on the SSD for performance consistency.
3. Data is promoted to the SSD based on its access frequency. The frequency is detected at the block level and below file system memory cache. Data migration happens in 128 KB chunks during idle or light I/O periods.
4. Operating system and other critical documents are always cached on the SSD. Applications are likely to be handled similarly. A regular file can reside on both devices.

== See also ==
- bcache, dm-cache, and Flashcache on Linux
- Smart Response Technology – a similar technology from Intel (for desktops)
- Intel Turbo Memory
- ExpressCache – used on a number of Wintel laptops
- Core Storage
- ZFS - A file system using similar technology
