= ESOS =

ESOS may refer to:

- The Energy Savings Opportunity Scheme - a UK scheme compatible with the EU Energy Efficiency Directive
- Enterprise Storage OS - a Linux distribution that serves storage area networks
- Earth Simulator Operating System - the operating system for the Earth Simulator supercomputer
- The Educational Services for Overseas Students Act 2000 or ESOS Act 2000, relevant to Education in Australia
