= Logical volume management =

Computer storage space allocation method

In computer storage, logical volume management (LVM) provides a method of allocating space on mass-storage devices that is more flexible than conventional partitioning schemes to store volumes. In particular, a volume manager can concatenate, stripe together or otherwise combine partitions (or block devices in general) into larger virtual partitions that administrators can re-size or move, potentially without interrupting system use.

Volume management represents just one of many forms of storage virtualization; its implementation takes place in a layer in the device-driver stack of an operating system (OS) (as opposed to within storage devices or in a network).

== Design ==
Linux Logical Volume Manager (LVM) v1

Most volume-manager implementations share the same basic design. They start with physical volumes (PVs), which can be either hard disks, hard disk partitions, or logical unit numbers (LUNs) of an external storage device. Volume management treats each PV as being composed of a sequence of chunks called physical extents (PEs). Some volume managers (such as that in HP-UX and Linux) have PEs of a uniform size; others (such as that in Veritas) have variably-sized PEs that can be split and merged at will.

Normally, PEs simply map one-to-one to logical extents (LEs). With mirroring, multiple PEs map to each LE. These PEs are drawn from a physical volume group (PVG), a set of same-sized PVs which act similarly to hard disks in a RAID 1 array. PVGs are usually laid out so that they reside on different disks or data buses for maximum redundancy.

The system pools LEs into a volume group (VG). The pooled LEs can then be concatenated together into virtual disk partitions called logical volumes or LVs. Systems can use LVs as raw block devices just like disk partitions: creating mountable file systems on them, or using them as swap storage.

Striped LVs allocate each successive LE from a different PV; depending on the size of the LE, this can improve performance on large sequential reads by bringing to bear the combined read-throughput of multiple PVs.

Administrators can grow LVs (by concatenating more LEs) or shrink them (by returning LEs to the pool). The concatenated LEs do not have to be contiguous. This allows LVs to grow without having to move already-allocated LEs. Some volume managers allow the re-sizing of LVs in either direction while online. Changing the size of the LV does not necessarily change the size of a file system on it; it merely changes the size of its containing space. A file system that can be resized online is recommended in that it allows the system to adjust its storage on-the-fly without interrupting applications.

PVs and LVs cannot be shared between or span different VGs (although some volume managers may allow moving them at will between VGs on the same host). This allows administrators conveniently to bring VGs online, to take them offline or to move them between host systems as a single administrative unit.

VGs can grow their storage pool by absorbing new PVs or shrink by retracting from PVs. This may involve moving already-allocated LEs out of the PV. Most volume managers can perform this movement online; if the underlying hardware is hot-pluggable this allows engineers to upgrade or replace storage without system downtime.

== Concepts ==
=== Hybrid volume ===
A hybrid volume is any volume that intentionally and opaquely makes use of two separate physical volumes. For instance, a workload may consist of random seeks so an SSD may be used to permanently store frequently used or recently written data, while using higher-capacity rotational magnetic media for long-term storage of rarely needed data. On Linux, bcache or dm-cache may be used for this purpose, while Fusion Drive may be used on OS X. ZFS also implements this functionality at the file system level, by allowing administrators to configure multi-level read/write caching.

Hybrid volumes present a similar concept as hybrid drives, which also combine solid-state storage and rotational magnetic media.

=== Snapshots ===
Some volume managers also implement snapshots by applying copy-on-write to each LE. In this scheme, the volume manager will copy the LE to a copy-on-write table just before it is written to. This preserves an old version of the LV, the snapshot, which may be later reconstructed by overlaying the copy-on-write table atop the current LV. Unless the volume management supports both thin provisioning and discard, once an LE in the origin volume is written to, it is permanently stored in the snapshot volume. If the snapshot volume was made smaller than its origin, which is a common practice, this may render the snapshot inoperable.

Snapshots can be useful for backing up self-consistent versions of volatile data such as table files from a busy database, or for rolling back large changes (such as an operating system upgrade) in a single operation. Snapshots have a similar effect as rendering storage quiescent, and are similar to the shadow copy (VSS) service in Microsoft Windows.

Some Linux-based Live CDs also use snapshots to simulate read-write access to a read-only optical disc.

== Implementations ==
Vendor	Introduced in	Volume manager	Allocate anywhere (Note: Denotes whether the volume manager allows LVs to grow and span onto any PV in the VG)	Snapshots	RAID 0	RAID 1	RAID 5	RAID 10	Thin provisioning	Notes
IBM	AIX 3.0 (1989)	Logical Volume Manager	Yes	Yes (Note: JFS2 snapshots)	Yes	Yes	No	Yes (Note: AIX 5.1)		Refers to PEs as PPs (physical partitions), and to LEs as LPs (logical partitions). Does not have a copy-on-write snapshot mechanism; creates snapshots by freezing one volume of a mirror pair.
Hewlett-Packard	HP-UX 9.0	HP Logical Volume Manager	Yes	Yes	Yes	Yes	No	Yes		
FreeBSD Foundation	FreeBSD	Vinum Volume Manager	Yes	Yes (Note: UFS snapshots)	Yes	Yes	Yes	Yes		The FreeBSD fast file system (UFS) supports snapshots.
FreeBSD Foundation	FreeBSD	ZFS	Yes	Yes	Yes	Yes	Yes	Yes	Yes	A file system with integrated volume management
The NetBSD Foundation, Inc.	NetBSD	Logical Volume Manager	Yes	No	Yes	Yes	No	No		NetBSD from version 6.0 supports its own re-implementation of Linux LVM. Re-implementation is based on a BSD licensed device-mapper driver and uses a port of Linux lvm tools as the userspace part of LVM. There is no need to support RAID5 in LVM because of NetBSD superior RAIDFrame subsystem.
The NetBSD Foundation, Inc.	NetBSD	ZFS	Yes	Yes	Yes	Yes	Yes	Yes	Yes	A file system with integrated volume management
The NetBSD Foundation, Inc.	NetBSD § 5.0 (2009)	bioctl arcmsr	No	No	Yes	Yes	Yes	Yes		bioctl on NetBSD can be used for both maintenance and initialisation of hardware RAID, although initialisation (through BIOCVOLOPS ioctl) is only supported by a single driver as of 2019 — arcmsr(4); software RAID is supported separately through RAIDframe and ZFS
The OpenBSD Project	OpenBSD 4.2 (2007)	bioctl softraid	Yes	No	Yes	Yes	Yes	Yes		bioctl on OpenBSD can be used for maintenance of hardware RAID, as well as for both initialisation and maintenance of software RAID
Sistina	Linux 2.2	Logical Volume Manager version 1	Yes	Yes	Yes	Yes	No		No	
IBM	Linux 2.4	Enterprise Volume Management System	Yes	Yes	Yes	Yes	Yes		No	
Sistina	Linux 2.6 and above	Logical Volume Manager version 2	Yes	Yes	Yes	Yes	Yes	Yes	Yes	
Oracle	Linux 2.6 and above	Btrfs	Yes	Yes	Yes	Yes	Yes (not stable)	Yes	—N/a	A file system with integrated volume management
Silicon Graphics	IRIX or Linux	XVM Volume Manager	Yes	Yes	Yes	Yes	Yes			
Sun Microsystems	SunOS	Solaris Volume Manager (was Solstice DiskSuite).	No	No	Yes	Yes	Yes	Yes		Refers to PVs as volumes (which can be combined with RAID0, RAID1 or RAID5 primitives into larger volumes), to LVs as soft partitions (which are contiguous extents placeable anywhere on volumes, but which cannot span multiple volumes), and to VGs as disk sets.
Sun Microsystems	Solaris 10	ZFS	Yes	Yes	Yes	Yes	Yes	Yes	Yes	A file system with integrated volume management
	illumos	ZFS	Yes	Yes	Yes	Yes	Yes	Yes	Yes	A file system with integrated volume management
Veritas (Note: Third-party product, available for Windows and many Unix-like OSes)	Cross-OS	Veritas Volume Manager (VxVM)	Yes	Yes	Yes	Yes	Yes	Yes		Refers to LVs as volumes, to VGs as disk groups; has variably-sized PEs called subdisks and LEs called plexes.
Microsoft	Windows 2000 and later NT-based operating systems	Logical Disk Manager	Yes	Yes (Note: Windows Server 2003 and later)	Yes	Yes	Yes	No	No	Does not have a concept of PEs or LEs; can only RAID0, RAID1, RAID5 or concatenate disk partitions into larger volumes; file systems must span whole volumes.
Microsoft	Windows 8	Storage Spaces	Yes	Yes	No	Yes	Yes	No	Yes	Higher-level logic than RAID1 and RAID5 - multiple storage spaces span multiple disks of different size, storage spaces are resilient from physical failure with either mirroring (at least 2 disks) or striped parity (at least 3 disks), disk management and data recovery is fully automatic
Microsoft	Windows 10	Storage Spaces	Yes	Yes	Yes	Yes	Yes	Yes	Yes	RAID 10 is called disk mirroring
Red Hat	Linux 4.14 and above	Stratis	Yes	Yes	No	No	No	No	Yes	RAID support planned in 2.0 version
Apple	Mac OS X Lion	Core Storage	Yes	No	No	No	No	No	No	Currently, it is used in Lion's implementation of FileVault, in order to allow for full disk encryption, as well as Fusion Drive, which is merely a multi-PV LVG. Snapshots are handled by Time Machine; Software-based RAID is provided by AppleRAID. Both are separate from Core Storage.

== Disadvantages ==
Logical volumes can suffer from external fragmentation when the underlying storage devices do not allocate their PEs contiguously. This can reduce I/O performance on slow-seeking media such as magnetic disks and other rotational media. Volume managers that use fixed-size PEs, however, typically make PEs relatively large (for example, Linux LVM uses 4 MB by default) in order to amortize the cost of these seeks.

With implementations that are solely volume management, such as Core Storage and Linux LVM, separating and abstracting away volume management from the file system loses the ability to easily make storage decisions for particular files or directories. For example, if a certain directory (but not the entire file system) is to be permanently moved to faster storage, both the file system layout and the underlying volume management layer need to be traversed. For example, on Linux it would be needed to manually determine the offset of a file's contents within a file system and then manually pvmove the extents (along with data not related to that file) to the faster storage. Having volume and file management implemented within the same subsystem, instead of having them implemented as separate subsystems, makes the overall process theoretically simpler.

== See also ==
- Device mapper
