= Solaris Volume Manager =

RAID software

Solaris Volume Manager (SVM; formerly known as Online: DiskSuite, and later Solstice DiskSuite) is a software package for creating, modifying and controlling RAID-0 (concatenation and stripe) volumes, RAID-1 (mirror) volumes, RAID 0+1 volumes, RAID 1+0 volumes, RAID-5 volumes, and soft partitions.

Version 1.0 of Online: DiskSuite was released as an add-on product for SunOS in late 1991; the product has undergone significant enhancements over the years. SVM has been included as a standard part of Solaris since Solaris 8 was released in February 2000.

SVM is similar in functionality to later software volume managers such as FreeBSD Vinum volume manager, allowing metadevices (virtual disks) to be concatenated, striped or mirrored together from physical ones. It also supports soft partitioning, dynamic hot spares, and growing metadevices. The mirrors support dirty region logging (DRL, called resync regions in DiskSuite) and logging support for RAID-5.

The ZFS file system, added in the Solaris 10 6/06 release, has its own integrated volume management capabilities, but SVM continues to be included with Solaris for use with other file systems.

== See also ==
- Logical volume management
- Sun Microsystems
