= Vinum =

Vinum may refer to:

- Vinum volume manager - a logical volume manager, also called Software RAID
- A Latin term meaning wine
