= Samsung Kies =

Application developed by Samsung

- Developer: Samsung
- Final release: 3.2.16084_2
- Operating system: Windows, Mac OS X
- Available in: Multilingual
- License: Proprietary freeware
- Website: www.samsung.com/sa_en/support/kies

Samsung Kies (/ˈkiːz/) is a freeware software application used to facilitate communication between Windows or Macintosh operating systems, and Samsung mobile phone and tablet computer devices, usually using a USB connection (though wireless LAN Kies connectivity is now possible using some devices). Samsung has released new software to replace Kies, named Samsung Smart Switch, which is mainly directed at migrating customers onto new Samsung devices. The name K.I.E.S. originated as an acronym for "Key Intuitive Easy System". After version 2.0, the name was shortened to "Kies".

== Versions ==
Kies was available in several versions and editions, depending on the specific Samsung device in question. Kies supported devices with Android 2.1 through 4.2. Kies3 (version 3.x) supported devices with Android Jelly Bean (4.3 and up). Trying to use Kies with newer devices, or Kies3 with older devices, would result in an error message.

There was also a Kies Mini version, which is available only for specific devices such as Samsung Captivate, Infuse, or Vibrant. It was used to update these devices' operating systems (OS versions). Though there are both Windows and Macintosh versions of the full Kies product, there is only a Windows version of Kies Mini for most Samsung devices; however, non-Windows users may overcome this limitation by using a Windows virtual machine, installing Kies Mini within it and connecting a Samsung device via USB cable to accomplish the OS update. On Windows devices, the file transfer happens via a plug-and-play mode. Since 2012, Intel processors have mounted the Cache Acceleration Software, which was tuned by system administrators when connected with SSD cards.

Although Kies connectivity has traditionally been via a mini or micro-USB cable (needing some software, and not plug and play), wireless LAN connectivity between a Samsung device on which the Kies Wireless Android app is running, and any Windows or Macintosh computer running the Kies full version is now also possible. The Kies Wireless app also supports wireless connectivity with other devices via the other devices' web browsers. All such connectivity, though, must be via a local Wi-Fi connection (and not via cellular 2G, 3G, or 4G data networks) wherein all involved devices are on the same Wi-Fi LAN.

The full version of Kies may be downloaded from the Samsung Global Download Center or from the download part of an individual mobile device's technical support web page on the Samsung website. With few exceptions, it is only the Kies Mini version, and not the full version, that is downloadable from a given Samsung device.

Smart Switch is part of a technical and commercial strategy finalized to connect all electronics in a unique semi-automation system, which is managed via a smartphone central app of Samsung.

== Alternative software ==
Since 2012, most of the Intel product line has mounted the Cache Acceleration Software, both as an accelerator and a temporary database in connection with the parallel subsystem named Intel Management Engine (with ring-3 privilege inside the device).

Trivial File Transfer Protocol is a simple lockstep protocol, optimized for a client-server network, rather than a one-to-one and peer-to-peer connection.

Android File Transfer for Linux is a FOSS app, stable since version 2.2., though FOSS is somewhere (e.g. on GitHub) protected under copyright law, and subject to file robots.txt mirroring exclusions.

== System requirements ==
OS	CPU	RAM	HDD space	Screen resolution	Required software
Windows 7 SP1, Windows 8, Windows 8.1	Intel Pentium Dual-Core 2.1 GHz processor or higher (recommended)	2 GB recommended	At least 500 MB	1366 × 768 (600), 32 bit or above	.NET Framework 4.6.1 or later, Windows Media Player 12 or later, DirectX 11 or above
Mac OS X 10.6 (Samsung Kies mini)	1.8 GHz Intel or faster processor	1 GB or more	30 MB of available hard disk space		Wave (GT–S8500) firmware upgrade is available for bada 1.2 or later. Wave II (GT–S8530)
