= Intel Turbo Memory =

Intel Turbo Memory is a technology introduced by Intel Corporation that uses NAND flash memory modules to reduce the time it takes for a computer to power up, access programs, and write data to the hard drive. During development, the technology was codenamed Robson. It is supported by most of the Core 2 Mobile chipset series, but not by the newer Core i Series mobile chipsets.

== Overview ==
The technology was publicly introduced on October 24, 2005, at the Intel Developer Forum (IDF) in Taiwan when a laptop that booted up almost immediately was demonstrated. The technology attempts to decrease hard drive usage by moving frequently accessed data over to the flash memory. Flash memory can be accessed faster than hard drives and requires less power to operate, thereby allowing laptops to operate faster while also being more power efficient.

The Turbo memory cache connects to a motherboard via a mini-PCIe interface. It is designed to leverage features introduced in Windows Vista, namely ReadyBoost (a supplementation of RAM-based disk caching by dedicated files on flash drives, except on the 512 MB version) and/or ReadyDrive (a non-volatile caching solution, i.e. an implementation of a hybrid drive, as long as the main storage isn't already one); as ReadyBoost is backed by temporary files on generic storage volumes, it is unofficially possible to destinate this space for general purpose storage.

Turbo Memory is not compatible with previous versions of Windows (with only a no-op driver that merely acknowledges the device existing for Windows 2000 and XP); Linux support is limited to a third-party experimental MTD driver only supporting 2 GB modules.

== Availability ==
Intel Turbo Memory was made available on May 9, 2007, on the Intel's Santa Rosa platform and their Crestline (GM965) chipsets. Intel Turbo Memory 2.0 was introduced on July 15, 2008, on Intel's Montevina platform and their Cantiga (GM47) chipsets. It is available in 1, 2, and 4GB modules. It is supported in the Intel 965 Express chipset, and the Intel 4 Series Express chipsets (2GB and 4GB modules only).

Several retailers, such as Acer, Asus, Dell, Lenovo, Sager, Toshiba, etc., sold laptops enabled with the Intel Turbo Memory technology.

== Reception ==
A review in AnandTech largely concurred with some OEM criticism finding that "it basically does nothing for the user experience". HP refused to use the technology. Ars Technica wrote in 2009 that Turbo Memory "never took off", and CNET similarly pronounced that it was "never widely adopted", because "Turbo Memory (and Turbo Memory 2.0) wasn't cheap, and it definitely wasn't worth the cost."

In 2009 Intel had announced the successor to Turbo Memory for the 5-Series mobile chipsets, codename Braidwood. However, the series was launched without this technology. The ThinkPad lineup built on the first generation Intel Core-i platform features lands to connect a Braidwood module, however no production ThinkPad motherboard had the connector populated. In 2011, The Register wrote "I think we can say Braidwood has sunk without trace."

== See also ==
- Disk buffer
- ExpressCache
- Hybrid drive
- Smart Response Technology
- 3D XPoint, marketed as Intel Optane memory
