= WDS =

WDS may refer to:

== Computing ==
- Webpack dev server
- Wireless distribution system, a wireless network bridging technology
- Windows Desktop Search, the implementation of Windows Search for Windows XP and Windows Server 2003
- Windows Desktop Sharing, a Microsoft screen-sharing technology
- Windows Deployment Services, a technology from Microsoft for network-based installation of Windows operating systems.
- World Data System, a system for preserving scientific data
- Worldwide Diagnostic System, a service tool for Ford trustmark automobile dealerships worldwide
- Wide-area data services, a feature of StorTrends iTX

== Other uses ==
- Shiyan Wudangshan Airport (IATA code)
- Wavelength-dispersive X-ray spectroscopy, a materials analysis method
- Washington Double Star Catalog, an astronomical publication
- Wet dog shakes, a rat behavioral test of psychedelic-like effects
