= VRPM =

vRPM, or virtual Revolutions Per Minute, was a term for a synthetic measurement of performance introduced by SanDisk for solid state drive (SSD) storage devices inside client PCs. vRPM was created to give users a metric to compare SSD performance to the hard disk drive (HDD) and other SSDs.

vRPM calculates how fast one would have to spin a virtual HDD to achieve the equivalent performance of an SSD in a client PC. It uses RPM (revolutions per minute), a de facto industry standard to measure the performance of the HDD inside PCs.

== Comparing SSD vs. HDD input/output operation ==
The performance of a storage device can be quantified as the number of input/output operations Per Second (IOPS) it achieves. HDD IOPS is proportional to RPM. When a system requests to read or write data randomly from/to a HDD, seek time and rotational latency are two HDD activities that significantly reduce HDD IOPS. Seek time is the time it takes to move the HDD head to the correct cylinder to begin to receive data. Rotational latency is the time it takes to rotate the HDD platter beneath the head so that the data can be read/written. Rotational latency varies based on the RPM of the HDD.

NAND flash is used as the non-volatile memory inside SSDs. It has faster random read than random write performance, since its write performance is delayed by the need to perform garbage collection to free space for writing. However, since NAND flash has no moving parts, the SSD achieves much higher IOPS than a HDD.

For the client PC usage model with approximately a 50:50 read/write ratio, a PC IOPS number can be calculated as follows:

$$PC IOPS (mean)=1/[0.5/SSD IOPS (Iwrite)] + [0.5/SSD IOPS (Iread)]$$

Using this equation, the results for client SSD PC performance are as follows:

- 2006–2007 SSD generation: 5,000 Read IOPS; 10 Write IOPS; 20 PC IOPS
- 2008 SSD generation: 10,000 Read IOPS; 100 Write IOPS; 200 PC IOPS
- 2009 (estimated) SSD generation: 25,000 Read IOPS; 400 Write IOPS; 785 PC IOPS

== Converting SSD IOPS rates into vRPM ==
The vRPM performance of an SSD can be calculated as follows:

$$vRPM=50/[0.5/SSD IOPS (Iwrite)] + [0.5/SSD IOPS (Iread)]$$

where:

- SSD IOPS (IWrite) is the sustained (to the SSD media) 4KB random write rate, Queue Depth=4
- SSD IOPS (IRead) is the sustained (to the SSD media) 4KB random read rate, Queue Depth=4
- 50 is the product factor in the calculation

Using this calculation, SSD vRPM rates can be shown to be significantly better than HDD RPM rates, particularly in later generation SSDs:

- 2006–2007 SSD generation: 5,000 Read IOPS; 10 Write IOPS; 20 PC IOPS; 1,000 vRPM
- 2008 SSD generation: 10,000 Read IOPS; 100 Write IOPS; 200 PC IOPS; 10,000 vRPM
- 2009 (estimated) SSD generation: 25,000 Read IOPS; 400 Write IOPS; 785 PC IOPS; 40,000 vRPM
- 2011 SSD generation: 35,000 Read IOPS; 14,000 Write IOPS; 24,500 PC IOPS; 1,225,000 vRPM

== vRPM adoption in industry ==
Despite its early objectives, vRPM has not become broadly supported in the industry and no longer appears on SanDisk's SSD website.

== See also ==
- Solid-state drive
- Hard disk drive
- Input/Output
