= Stratis (configuration daemon) =

Linux storage configuration daemon

stratisd
- Initial release: 28 September 2018; 6 years ago
- Stable release: 3.7.2 / October 16, 2024; 5 months ago
- Repository: github.com/stratis-storage/stratisd
- Written in: Rust
- Operating system: Linux
- License: Mozilla Public License 2.0
- Website: stratis-storage.github.io

stratis-cli
- Stable release: 3.7.0 / October 16, 2024; 5 months ago
- Repository: github.com/stratis-storage/stratis-cli
- Written in: Python
- Operating system: Linux
- License: Apache License 2.0
- Website: stratis-storage.github.io

Stratis is a user-space configuration daemon that configures and monitors existing components from Linux's underlying storage components of logical volume management (LVM) and XFS filesystem via D-Bus.

== Details ==
Stratis is not a user-level filesystem like the Filesystem in Userspace (FUSE) system. Stratis configuration daemon was originally developed by Red Hat to have feature parity with ZFS and Btrfs. The hope was due to Stratis configuration daemon being in userland, it would more quickly reach maturity versus the years of kernel level development of file systems ZFS and Btrfs. It is built upon enterprise-tested components LVM and XFS with over a decade of enterprise deployments and the lessons learned from System Storage Manager in Red Hat Enterprise Linux 7.

Stratis provides ZFS/Btrfs-style features by integrating layers of existing technology: Linux's device mapper subsystem, and the XFS filesystem. The stratisd daemon manages collections of block devices, and provides a D-Bus API. The stratis-cli DNF package provides a command-line tool stratis, which itself uses the D-Bus API to communicate with stratisd.

== See also ==
- Comparison of file systems
- List of file systems
- APFS – a copy-on-write file system for macOS, iOS, tvOS, and watchOS
- HAMMER – DragonFly BSD's file system that uses B-trees, paired with checksums as a countermeasure for data corruption
- ReFS – a copy-on-write file system for Windows Server 2012
