= Lenovo IdeaCentre A740 =

Model of computer

The Lenovo IdeaCentre A740 is an all-in-one desktop computer with a 27-inch touchscreen released by Lenovo in 2014.

== Specifications and features ==
The A740 has a 27-inch frameless glossy screen with a resolution of up to 2560x1440 and capacitive ten-finger touch technology. The A740's screen is only 0.15" at its thinnest point. The screen is anchored by a base which includes most of the unit's hardware and all of its ports, and the mount allows adjusting the angle from 90 degrees down to -5 degrees – one example use is as a "chess board".

The A740 uses a quad-core Intel Core-i7 processor, 8 gigabytes of RAM, and a 1-terabyte Solid State Hybrid Drive with an 8GB SSD part. There is no optical drive in the machine itself, but a USB DVD burner is given as a standard accessory along with the USB (wireless) keyboard and mouse. Ports include ethernet, HDMI, combined audio jack for headphones/microphone, four USB 3.0 connections and a 6-in-1 card reader. The A740's ability to accept HDMI input allows for using the screen with external devices. An internal TV-tuner is optional.

== Reviews ==
In a review published by Techaeris, Alex Hernandez wrote "Overall the A740 scores a 4.3 out of 5 here. There are some great things about this all-in-one and just a few things that need improvement. The hardware and design are great on this machine, Lenovo has been doing some very awesome things in that department. The display is a high point as well and even the price and value is right up there and competes with Apple’s iMac".
