= Core Storage =

Logical volume management system on macOS

Core Storage is a logical volume management system on macOS that was introduced by Apple in Mac OS X Lion. Core Storage is a layer between the disk partition and the file system.

Core Storage is the basis for Apple's Fusion Drive technology, which presents several partitions on multiple drives as a single logical volume. It does this by using tiered storage, whereby it keeps the most frequently used blocks on the fastest storage device in the pool, which is, by default, an SSD.

== Description ==
Apple CoreStorage defines four types of objects, instances of which are uniquely represented by UUIDs:

- Physical Volume (PV)

This is the actual physical storage device such as an internal hard drive or solid state drive. A PV is normally real media but it can be a disk image or even an AppleRAID Set. A disk offered to be a PV must be a partition and the encompassing scheme must be GPT.

- Logical Volume Group (LVG)

This is the equivalent of volume groups in Linux LVM. The Logical Volume Group (LVG) is the top, or pool, level; zero or more may exist during any OS boot time session. An LVG exports zero or more Logical Volume Families (LVFs).

- Logical Volume Family (LVF)

An LVF contains properties which govern and bind together all of its descendant Logical Volumes (LVs). These properties mainly provide settings for full-disk encryption (such as whether the LVG is encrypted, which users have access, etc). An LVF exports one or more LVs.

- Logical Volume (LV)

A logical volume exports a dev node, upon which a file system (such as Journaled HFS+) resides.

== Notes ==
Apple's current implementation is not intended for the traditional roles that LVMs have been used for. For example, as of 2014, the pool cannot be expanded as the storage grows. Also in 10.7, the pool can comprise only a single drive. Core Storage also doesn't support thin provisioning, different RAID levels or resiliency. However, like in Linux, but unlike in Windows, the LVM can be used as the root filesystem, a significant advantage for home users who prefer to have a single volume for the OS and storage or find the need to extend the amount of storage available to the core operating system.

== See also ==
- Logical volume management
- Fusion Drive
