= StorTrends =

Brand name of computer data storage products

- Type: Private
- Industry: Data storage devices Information Technology; SSD Hybrid Arrays
- Founded: 2004
- Headquarters: 5555 Oakbrook Parkway Building 280; Norcross, Georgia, United States
- Key people: Subramonian Shankar (President and Founder); Paresh Chatterjee (Chief Technology Officer); Sukha Ghosh (VP of Engineering); Deba Talapatra (VP of Product Control)
- Products: SAN and NAS data storage appliances
- Website: www.stortrends.com

StorTrends is a brand name of disk-based, hybrid array, and solid state storage products for computer data storage in data centers, sold by AmZetta Technologies. Formally a division of American Megatrends, StorTrends appliances utilize the iTX architecture, which includes features such as deduplication and compression, SSD caching and SSD tiering, automated tiered storage, replication, data archiving, snapshots, WAN optimization, and a VMware vSphere plug-in.

== History ==
StorTrends started in 2004 as the storage area network (SAN) and network-attached storage (NAS) product division of American Megatrends. In 2011, StorTrends released the 3400i dual controller SAN unit. In January 2014, it released the 3500i SSD hybrid SAN array as the first hybrid system with tandem SSD Caching and SSD Tiering. Similar to the 3400i, the 3500i received third-party validation from analysts at the Taneja Group, among others. In March 2015, StorTrends released the 3600i and 3610i All Flash SAN models with inline compression and deduplication technology support with a starting price tag of $24,999. In July 2015, StorTrends won a Most Valuable Product (MVP) award from Computer Technology Review for the 3600i All Flash SAN. In Q1 2017, StorTrends released the 2610i All Flash Array - a 2U, 24-bay system designed for high performance workloads and I/O-intensive environments. In April, 2019, StorTrends became a division of AmZetta Technologies.

== Products ==
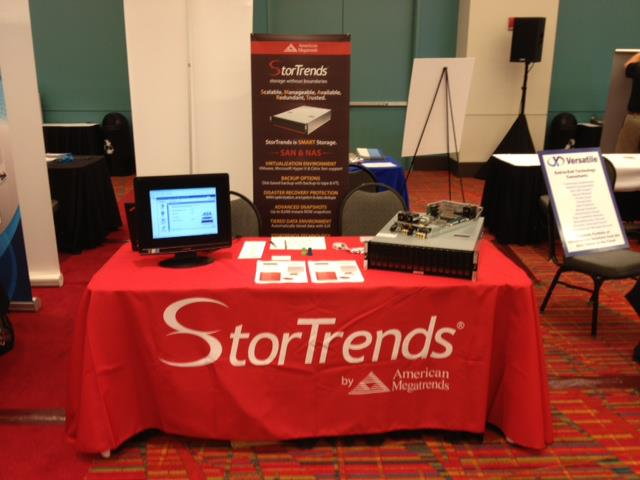
StorTrends 3500i at VMUG Conference

StorTrends units are shipped with SSDs, spinning HDDs, or a mixture of the two known as an SSD Hybrid Array. The StorTrends 3400i is a spinning-disk SAN with expansion capabilities up to 256 TB. The StorTrends 3500i is an SSD hybrid SAN that offers both SSD caching and SSD tiering in the same appliance in order to preserve flash performance for both frequently accessed data and random IO. The 3600i is an All Flash SAN with a specified Read Tier and Write Tier to increase the lifespan of the flash drives. The StorTrends 2610i is the latest generation All Flash Array with deduplication, compression, and dedicated Hot and Cold Tiers to deliver sustained high performance in a dense 2U, 24-bay system. The StorTrends appliances range from 2 TB to 256 TB of raw storage capacity. Its SAN products utilize the iSCSI protocol and support 1 GbE and 10 GbE connectivity with multiple teaming options. The StorTrends models and specifications are shown below:

	3400i	3500i	3600i	3610i	2610i
Max. usable capacity	256 TB	256 TB	64 TB	256 TB	256 TB
Form Factor	3U	3U	3U	3U	2U
Number of drive bays	16	16	16	16	24
NL-SAS Drive Support (7.2k RPM)	2 TB, 4 TB, 6 TB	2 TB, 4 TB, 6 TB	N/A	N/A	N/A
SAS Drive Support (15k RPM)	300 GB, 450 GB, 600 GB	N/A	N/A	N/A	N/A
SSD Drive Support	N/A	200 GB, 400 GB, 800 GB, 2 TB	Write Tier: 200 GB, 400 GB, 800 GB, 1.6 TB, 2 TB; Read Tier: 240 GB, 480 GB, 960 GB, 1.6 TB, 2 TB, 3.8 TB	Write Tier: 200 GB, 400 GB, 800 GB, 1.6 TB, 2 TB; Read Tier: Read Tier: 240 GB, 480 GB, 960 GB, 1.6 TB, 2 TB, 3.8 TB	240 GB, 480 GB, 960 GB, 1.9 TB, 3.8 TB
No. of Controllers	2	2	2	2	2
Memory/ system	16 GB (8 GB per controller)	32 GB (16 GB per controller)	64 GB (32 GB per controller)	192 GB (96 GB per controller)	192 GB (96 GB per controller)
RAID Levels	1, 5, 6, 10, 50, 60	1, 5, 6, 10, 50, 60	1, 5, 50	1, 5, 50	1, 5, 10
JBOD expansion	Yes	Yes	No	Yes	Yes

== Architecture ==
StorTrends iTX architecture is an enterprise class feature set founded on 50 storage-based patents with over 70 additional patents pending. All of the StorTrends appliances are shipped pre-installed with the StorTrends iTX architecture. StorTrends iTX features include:

- deduplication and compression
- Enlift caching algorithm (write IO and drive endurance optimization)
- SSD caching and SSD tiering
- snap-assisted replication
- automated data tiering
- thin, exact and auto provisioning
- redirect-on-write snapshots
- VMware plug-in for vSphere
- SAN (block) and NAS (file) support
- advanced snapshots (SnapTrends)
- replication (disaster recovery)
- wide-area data services (WDS)
- data archiving (data deduplication)
- GUI web-based management
- ManageTrends
- storage resource management charts

== Support ==
StorTrends support, known as StorAID, is a 24x7 support service offering warranty, maintenance and alert monitoring of the StorTrends appliances. StorAID is offered in 1 year, 3 year and 5 year terms with one year renewal options. StorAid is offered standard with NBD (Next Business Day) onsite hardware replacement. StorAID support is conducted by members of the StorTrends Support Team from Norcross, Georgia. StorTrends is VMware, Microsoft and Citrix certified.

VMware Support:

- TAP Elite Partner, VAAI Support, vSphere Client Plug-in
- VMware ESX 3.5, vSphere 4.0, 4.1, 5.0, 5.1, 5.5, and 6.0+ HCL

Microsoft Support:

- Hyper-V Support and Microsoft Gold Partner

Citrix Support:

- Citrix Ready

== Customers ==
StorTrends claims thousands of customer installs in varying verticals, including: education, legal services, retail, engineering, government, manufacturing, and healthcare.
