= Spin-up =

Computing process

Spin-up refers to the process of a hard disk drive or optical disc drive accelerating its platters or inserted optical disc from a stopped state to an operational speed. The required operational speed depends on the design of the disk drive. Typical speeds of hard disks have been 2400, 3600, 4200, 5400, 7200, 10000 and 15000 revolutions per minute (RPM). Achieving such speeds can require a significant portion of the available power budget of a computer system, and so application of power to the disks must be carefully controlled. Operational speed of optical disc drives may vary depending on type of disc and mode of operation (see Constant linear velocity).

Spin-up of hard disks generally occurs at the very beginning of the computer boot process. However, most modern computers have the ability to stop a drive while the machine is already running as a means of energy conservation or noise reduction. If a machine is running and requires access to a stopped drive, then a delay is incurred while the drive is spun up. It also depends on the type of mechanism used within.

A drive in the process of being spun up needs more energy input than a drive that is already spinning at operation speeds, since more effort is required for the electric motor to accelerate the platters, as opposed to maintaining their speed.

== Time ==
The period of time taken by the drive to perform this process is referred to as its spin-up time, the average of which is reported by hard disks as a S.M.A.R.T. attribute.

== Control ==
A few feature exist to control the spin-up of disk devices on disk power-up, so that not all disks are spinning up all at once. Avoiding simultaneous spin-up helps keel the inrush current under power supply limits.

=== SATA and PATA ===
Staggered spin-up (SSU) and Power-Up In Standby (PUIS) are features that can help control spin-up of multiple drives within a computer system or a disk subsystem. Both are defined in the ATA Specifications Standards.

Staggered spin-up (SSU) was introduced into SATA revision 2.5 in 2005. SSU allows a SATA host bus adapter to spin up hard drives in a sequential manner. In SATA 2.5 and above, the drive starts without spinup if the "disabled stagged spinup" (DSS) pin (standard power connector pin 11) is left floating. It only spins up when spoken to (physical layer initialization). On connectors designed around older SATA revisions, the pin is connected to ground, disabling the feature.

Power-up in standby (PUIS), also known as PM2 by Western Digital, is used on some Serial ATA (SATA) and Parallel ATA (sometimes called PATA or IDE) hard disk drives. PUIS requires BIOS and/or driver support to use. When power is applied to the hard disk drive, the drive will not spin-up until a SET FEATURES device spin-up command is issued. The computer system BIOS or RAID controller must issue the command to tell the drive(s) to spin-up before they can be accessed. PUIS can be enabled by tools such as hdparm for drives which support this feature.

In either case, there is no requirement for how the host times the spinup. For example, a host can wait a set amount of time for each disk to spin up, or wait for each disk to indicate that it is spun up and ready.

=== SAS ===
The SCSI START STOP UNIT command is introduced in SBC-2 to "stop" and "start" a drive, but it does not actually control the initial spin-up. Initial spinup control was proposed to Serial Attached SCSI (SAS) only in 2002. On SPINUP-enabled drives, the drive powers up in an "Active_Wait" state and requires a NOTIFY(ENABLE SPINUP) command to start spinning up. As of 2005, there is no standard way to control whether the drive should start in wait.

== See also ==
- Inrush current
