= Taneja Group =

American analyst and consulting group

Taneja Group, Inc.
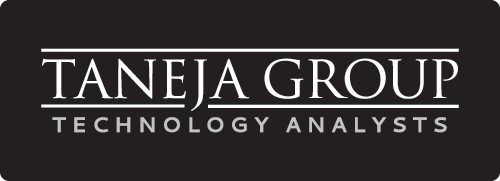
- Industry: Industry analyst
- Founded: 2003
- Founder: Arun Taneja
- Defunct: 2020
- Headquarters: Hopkinton, Massachusetts
- Services: Research; Consulting
- Website: www.tanejagroup.com

Taneja Group was an analyst and consulting group headquartered in Hopkinton, Massachusetts. It was founded in 2003 by Arun Taneja, and provided analysis and consulting for the technology industry. Specializing in storage and virtualization, it worked with companies such as Dell, Nutanix, VMware, Oracle, and HP.
