= Lenovo IdeaCentre A720 =

The Lenovo IdeaCentre A720 is an all-in-one desktop computer with a 27-inch touchscreen released by Lenovo in 2012.

== Specifications and features ==
The A720 has a 27-inch frameless glossy screen with a resolution of 1920x1080 and capacitive touch technology. Lenovo claims it is the slimmest in its class. The screen is anchored by a base which includes most of the unit's hardware and all of its ports. Lenovo says that this design makes ports more accessible.

The A720 uses a quad-core Intel Core-i7 processor, 8 gigabytes of RAM, and a 1-terabyte hard drive. A DVD-drive comes standard and an upgrade to Blu-ray is an option. Ports include ethernet, two USB 3.0 and two USB 2.0 connections respectively, and HDMI ports for both input and output. The A720's ability to accept HDMI input allows for using the screen with external devices.

A wireless mouse and keyboard that connect via Wi-Fi are included.

== Reviews ==
A review published in the Bangkok Post stated, "With all its merits, the A720 is not the perfect home computing solution. It is the most expensive on the market, has a very reflective screen, suffers the same service issues as notebooks with its compact form factor, and its touchscreen has few applications (for now). But the screen is fantastic (reflection issues apart), it's plenty powerful and it can be used as a replacement TV, which should win many punters over."

In a review published by ZDNet, James Kendrick wrote, "The 27-inch display is simply gorgeous whether working on the desktop or playing video in full-screen glory. The latter is a key function of the A720, whether using the Blu-ray drive or other video source. There is an optional TV tuner and full remote control to turn the system into an HD TV system. This is such a good desktop PC that it's easy to forget that it supports full touch operation. This is very precise and handles 10 finger touch. The display swivels down at virtually any angle for touch operation, including almost flat on the desktop."
