= EnhanceIO =

EnhanceIO is a disk cache module for the Linux kernel. Its goal is to use fast but relatively small SSD drives to improve the performance of large but slow hard drives.

== Overview ==
EnhanceIO makes it possible to add an SSD or other fast disk device as a cache to another block device, such as a hard drive, in order to improve the performance of the disk. It was initially based on Facebook's similar Flashcache module. Unlike Flashcache and other caching solutions, it doesn't use the Linux device mapper. This means it does not create a new block device and caching can be added to existing disks, without reformatting or even unmounting them. This makes it easy to add cache to existing systems.

== History ==
EnhanceIO was first announced as a commercial product in 2011 by sTec Inc, a company specializing in SSD products. Late 2012 sTec published code for the Linux module on GitHub. Even though it was then soon submitted to the Linux kernel mailing list, it was never merged into the main kernel.

In 2013, Western Digital acquired sTec Inc. They offered the EnhanceIO product briefly under their HGST brand. However, the project was soon discontinued and maintenance on the module halted.

As the project was abandoned, several forks were created with some patches to let EnhanceIO work on later kernels. As of 2017, the lanconnected fork seems to be most active.

== See also ==
- bcache
- dm-cache
- Flashcache
