= Jens Axboe =

Danish Linux kernel hacker (born 1976)

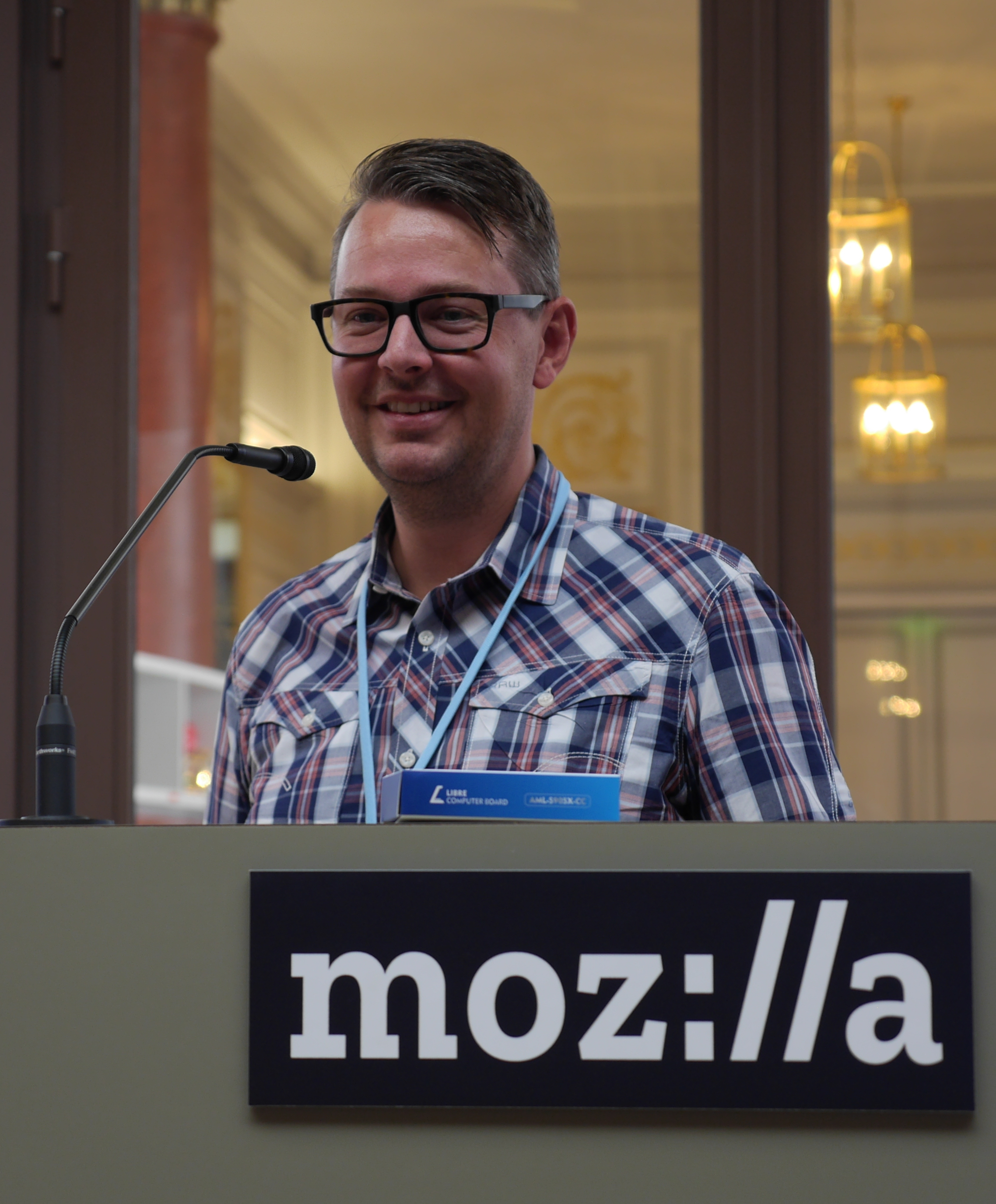
- Born: 1976 or 1977 (age 49–50); Odense, Denmark
- Occupation: Software engineer
- Employer: Facebook
- Notable work: CFQ

Jens Axboe (born circa 1976) is a Linux kernel hacker.

== Work ==
Axboe is the current Linux kernel maintainer of the block layer and other block devices, along with contributing the CFQ I/O scheduler, Noop scheduler, Deadline scheduler, io_uring, and the splice I/O architecture. Jens is also the author of the blktrace utility and kernel parts, which provides a way to trace every block I/O activity in the Linux kernel. blktrace exists in 2.6.17 and later Linux kernels.

To facilitate his block layer work in the Linux kernel, Axboe created the flexible I/O tester (fio) benchmarking and workload simulation tool. fio is able to simulate various types of I/O loads, such as synchronous, asynchronous, mmap, etc., as well as specifying the number of threads or processes, read vs. write mix, and various other parameters. fio was used to set the record in December 2012 for the highest number of I/Os-per-second (IOPS) in a single system.

In May 2010 Axboe joined Fusion-io after leaving Oracle Corporation. He announced on a mailing list on Friday, January 24, 2014, that he was leaving Fusion-io after 3.5 years to join Facebook.
