= Disk buffer =

Buffer between a computer and a storage disk

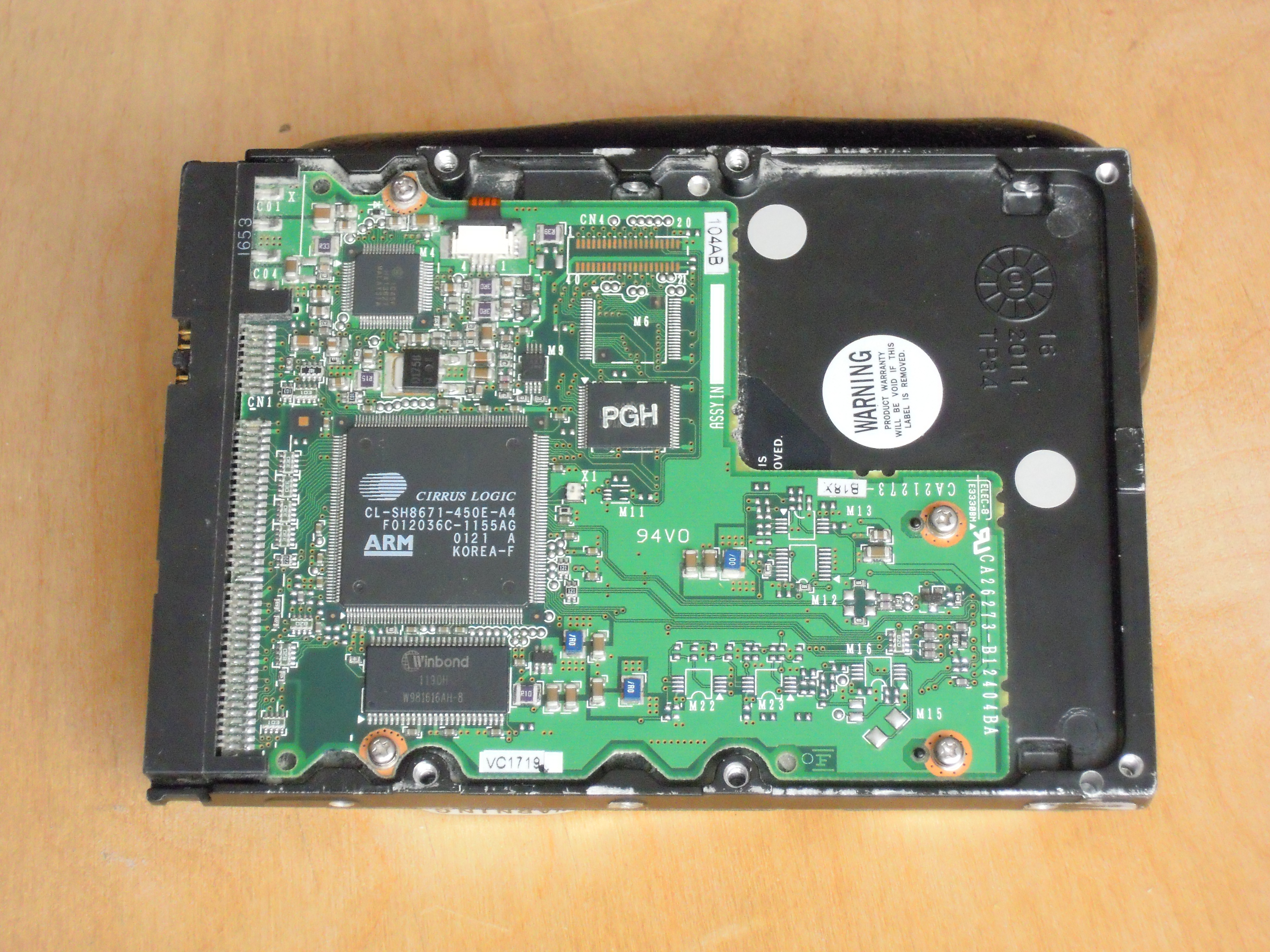
On this hard disk drive, the controller board contains a RAM integrated circuit used for the disk buffer.

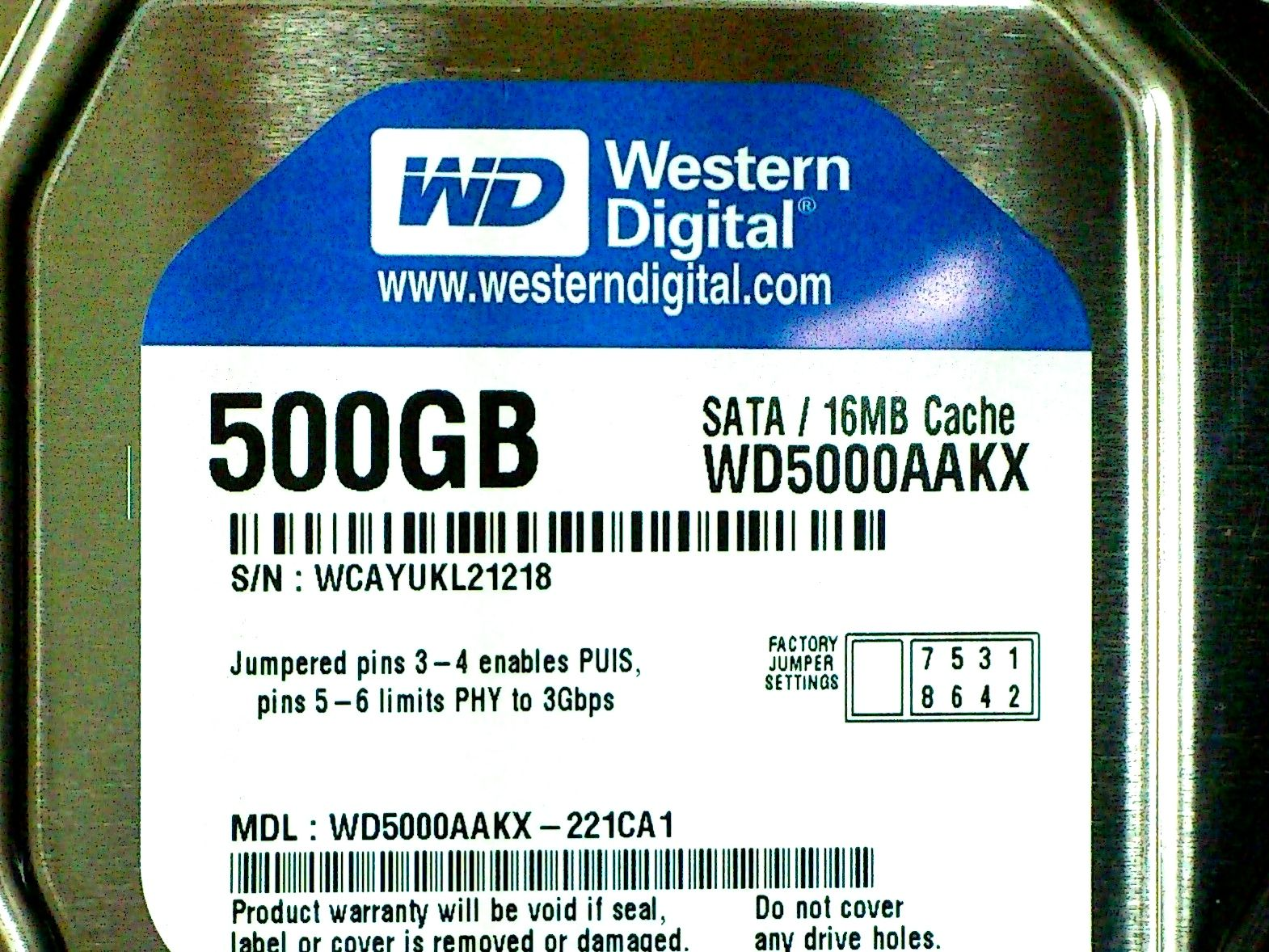
A 500 GB Western Digital hard disk drive with a 16 MB buffer

In computer storage, a disk buffer (often ambiguously called a disk cache or a cache buffer) is the embedded memory in a hard disk drive (HDD) or solid-state drive (SSD) acting as a buffer between the rest of the computer and the physical hard disk platter or flash memory that is used for storage. Modern hard disk drives come with 8 to 256 MiB of such memory, and solid-state drives come with up to 4 GB of cache memory.

Since the late 1980s, nearly all disks sold have embedded microcontrollers and either an ATA, Serial ATA, SCSI, or Fibre Channel interface. The drive circuitry usually has a small amount of memory, used to store the data going to and coming from the disk platters.

The disk buffer is physically distinct from and is used differently from the page cache typically kept by the operating system in the computer's main memory. The disk buffer is controlled by the microcontroller in the hard disk drive, and the page cache is controlled by the computer to which that disk is attached. The disk buffer is usually quite small, ranging between 8 MB and 4 GB, and the page cache is generally all unused main memory. While data in the page cache is reused multiple times, the data in the disk buffer is rarely reused. In this sense, the terms disk cache and cache buffer are misnomers; the embedded controller's memory is more appropriately called disk buffer.

Note that disk array controllers, as opposed to disk controllers, usually have normal cache memory of around 0.5–8 GiB.

== Uses ==
=== Read-ahead/read-behind ===
When a disk's controller executes a physical read, the actuator moves the read/write head to (or near to) the correct cylinder. After some settling and possibly fine-actuating the read head begins to pick up track data, and all is left to do is wait until platter rotation brings the requested data.

The data read ahead of request during this wait is unrequested but free, so typically saved in the disk buffer in case it is requested later.

Similarly, data can be read for free behind the requested one if the head can stay on track because there is no other read to execute or the next actuating can start later and still complete in time.

If several requested reads are on the same track (or close by on a spiral track), most unrequested data between them will be both read ahead and behind.

=== Speed matching ===
The speed of the disk's I/O interface to the computer almost never matches the speed at which the bits are transferred to and from the hard disk platter. The disk buffer is used so that both the I/O interface and the disk read/write head can operate at full speed.

=== Write acceleration ===
The disk's embedded microcontroller may signal the main computer that a disk write is complete immediately after receiving the write data, before the data is actually written to the platter. This early signal allows the main computer to continue working even though the data has not actually been written yet. This can be somewhat dangerous, because if power is lost before the data is permanently fixed in the magnetic media, the data will be lost from the disk buffer, and the file system on the disk may be left in an inconsistent state.

On some disks, this vulnerable period between signaling the write complete and fixing the data can be arbitrarily long, as the write can be deferred indefinitely by newly arriving requests. For this reason, the use of write acceleration can be controversial. Consistency can be maintained, however, by using a battery-backed memory system for caching data, although this is typically only found in high-end RAID controllers.

Alternatively, the caching can simply be turned off when the integrity of data is deemed more important than write performance. Another option is to send data to disk in a carefully managed order and to issue "cache flush" commands in the right places, which is usually referred to as the implementation of write barriers.

=== Command queuing ===
Newer SATA and most SCSI disks can accept multiple commands while any one command is in operation through "command queuing" (see NCQ and TCQ). These commands are stored by the disk's embedded controller until they are completed. One benefit is that the commands can be re-ordered to be processed more efficiently, so that commands affecting the same area of a disk are grouped together. Should a read reference the data at the destination of a queued write, the to-be-written data will be returned.

NCQ is usually used in combination with enabled write buffering. In case of a read/write FPDMA command with Force Unit Access (FUA, see below) bit set to 0 and enabled write buffering, an operating system may see the write operation finished before the data is physically written to the media. In case of FUA bit set to 1 and enabled write buffering, write operation returns only after the data is physically written to the media.

== Cache control from the host ==
=== Cache flushing ===
Data that was accepted in write cache of a disk device will be eventually written to disk platters, provided that no starvation condition occurs as a result of firmware flaws, and that disk power supply is not interrupted before all cached writes are forced to disk platters. In order to control the write cache, ATA specification included FLUSH CACHE (E7h) and FLUSH CACHE EXT (EAh) commands. These commands cause the disk to complete writing data from its volatile write cache (such as DRAM), and the disk will return "good" status after data in the volatile write cache is written to disk media or flash media. In addition, when the drive received a STANDBY IMMEDIATE command, on disk media this command will park the head, on flash media this command will save FTL mapping table.

A modern operating system (such as Windows and Linux) will send FLUSH CACHE and STANDBY IMMEDIATE command to hard disk drives in the shutdown process. Also, a modern operating system will execute sync () periodically, which usually execute FLUSH CACHE command; Windows will execute FlushFileBuffers () automatically, time is based on I/O activities.

Mandatory cache flushing is used in Linux for write barriers in some filesystems (for example, ext4), together with Force Unit Access write command for journal commit blocks.

=== Force Unit Access (FUA) ===
Force Unit Access (FUA) is an I/O write command option that forces written data all the way to stable storage. FUA write commands (WRITE DMA FUA EXT – 3Dh, WRITE DMA QUEUED FUA EXT – 3Eh, WRITE MULTIPLE FUA EXT – CEh), in contrast to corresponding commands without FUA, write data directly to the media, regardless of whether write caching in the device is enabled or not. FUA write command will not return until data is written to media, thus data written by a completed FUA write command is on permanent media even if the device is powered off before issuing a FLUSH CACHE command.

FUA appeared in the SCSI command set, and was later adopted by SATA with NCQ. FUA is more fine-grained as it allows a single write operation to be forced to stable media and thus has smaller overall performance impact when compared to commands that flush the entire disk cache, such as the ATA FLUSH CACHE family of commands.

Windows (Vista and up) supports FUA as part of Transactional NTFS, but only for SCSI or Fibre Channel disks where support for FUA is common. It is not known whether a SATA drive that supports FUA write commands will actually honor the command and write data to disk platters as instructed; thus, Windows 8 and Windows Server 2012 instead send commands to flush the disk write cache after certain write operations.

Although the Linux kernel gained support for NCQ around 2007, SATA FUA remains disabled by default because of regressions that were found in 2012 when the kernel's support for FUA was tested. The Linux kernel supports FUA at the block layer level.

== See also ==
- Hybrid array
- Hybrid drive
