= LOOK algorithm =

Hard disk scheduling algorithm

LOOK is a hard disk scheduling algorithm used to determine the order in which new disk read and write requests are processed.

== Description ==
The LOOK algorithm, similar to the SCAN algorithm, honors requests on both sweep directions of the disk head, however, it additionally "looks" ahead to see if there are any requests pending in the direction of head movement. If no requests are pending in the direction of head movement, then the disk head traversal will be reversed to the opposite direction and requests on the other direction can be served. In LOOK scheduling, the arm goes only as far as final requests in each direction and then reverses direction without going all the way to the end. Consider an example, Given a disk with 200 cylinders (0-199), suppose we have 8 pending requests: 98, 183, 37, 122, 14, 124, 65, 67 and that the read/write head is currently at cylinder 53. In order to complete these requests, the arm will move in the increasing order first and then will move in decreasing order after reaching the end. So, the order in which it will execute is 65, 67, 98, 122, 124, 183, 37, 14.

LOOK avoids the starvation problem of shortest seek time first (SSTF). This is because LOOK is biased against the area recently traversed, and favors tracks clustered at the outermost and innermost edges of the platter. LOOK is also biased towards more recently arriving jobs (on average).

== Variants ==
=== C-LOOK ===
One variant of LOOK is circular LOOK (C-LOOK). It is an effort to remove the bias in LOOK for track clusters at the edges of the platter. C-LOOK basically only scans in one direction. Either you sweep from the inside out, or the outside in. When you reach the end, you just swing the head all the way back to the beginning. This actually takes advantage of the fact that many drives can move the read/write head at high speeds if it's moving across a large number of tracks (e.g. the seek time from the last track to track 0 is smaller than one would expect and usually considerably less than the time it would take to seek there one track at a time). The huge jump from one end request to the other is not considered as a head movement as the cylinders are treated as a circular list.

=== N-LOOK and F-LOOK ===
N and F LOOK were designed to offset LOOK’s bias towards recent jobs. Both algorithms partition the request queue into smaller sub queues and process the sub queues in order (oldest first). N-LOOK is so-called because the request queue is divided into N sub queues. F-LOOK is a simplification where there are only 2 queues, but they are used in a double-buffered fashion. While F-LOOK is processing one queue, all new requests go into the other one. To explain these algorithms we’re going to use the example of a disk with 200 tracks, and the read/write head starts at track 100. The request queue, in order, contains requests for tracks: 55, 58, 18, 90, 160, 38, we assume that the request queue is split into two, with the oldest one containing the requests for tracks: 55, 58, 18, 90. In this instance, N-LOOK and F-LOOK behave the same. Also notice, that in this configuration, it doesn’t matter which direction the head was moving in, all requested tracks are less than 100 so it will only move in the direction of decreasing tracks. Even through the average number of tracks traversed is the same as LOOK in the worst case, N and F LOOK are in some sense, more fair than plain old LOOK. The sub queue system caps the maximum latency a process can expect between a request and it being serviced (unlike SSTF that can starve processes for arbitrary lengths of time).

=== S-LOOK ===
The shortest LOOK (S-LOOK) algorithm is an extension of the LOOK algorithm to handle the cases where the disk head is located between the far-end requests. The algorithm is designed to make a decision of which direction should be served first instead of only continuing to seek in the same direction before the new requests have arrived. Since the seek time is directly proportional to the seek distance, our goal is to minimize the seek distance, and hence, reduce the seek time.

== Performance ==
LOOK has slightly better average seek times than SCAN. C-LOOK has a slightly lower variance in seek time than LOOK since the worst case seek time is nearly cut in half.

== See also ==
- SCAN - Elevator algorithm
- FSCAN
- N-Step-SCAN
