= NCQ =

NCQ or ncq may refer to:

- Native Command Queuing, hard disk drive optimization
- Northern Katang language, ISO 639-3 language code ncq
