= Tech Field Day =

- Genre: Information technology
- Frequency: 7 per year
- Locations: Silicon Valley, Boston, Austin, Seattle, Denver
- Years active: 16
- Founded: November 12, 2009
- Founders: Stephen Foskett
- Organizer: Gestalt IT Media, LLC
- Website: TechFieldDay.com

Tech Field Day is an independently organized conference series centered on enterprise IT infrastructure. Organized by Gestalt IT Media LLC, the Field Day series is intended to bring together product vendors and independent bloggers, freelance writers, speakers, and leaders of online communities. The Field Day event series began in 2009 with a general datacenter event and expanded in 2010 to include an event focused on enterprise networking.

== Notable Introductions ==
Every Field Day event includes presentations by hardware and software vendors, but some notable introductions have also occurred at these events:

- Guardicore explains why traditional segmentation solutions are irrelevant and talk about software defined segmentation, unveils User Identity Rules and FQDN rules - at Security Field Day 2 2019.
- Data Robotics introduced their Drobo S and DroboElite models at the 2009 Field Day as well as the Drobo FS at the 2010 Boston event.
- Nimble Storage used the 2010 Seattle Field Day as their corporate launch event.
- Actifio used Tech Field Day 4 as their corporate launch event.
- Druva Software used Tech Field Day 5 as their American corporate launch event.
- Zerto and Embrane gave advance previews before their launches at Tech Field Day 6 and Networking Field Day 2, respectively.
- Exablox used Storage Field Day 3 as their launch event. Also at that event, Fusion-io announced their acquisition of NexGen Storage and Cisco Systems first showed the next-generation MDS Fibre Channel platform.

== See also ==
- IT Leader Forum
