= Western Digital Raptor =

American high performance hard disk drives

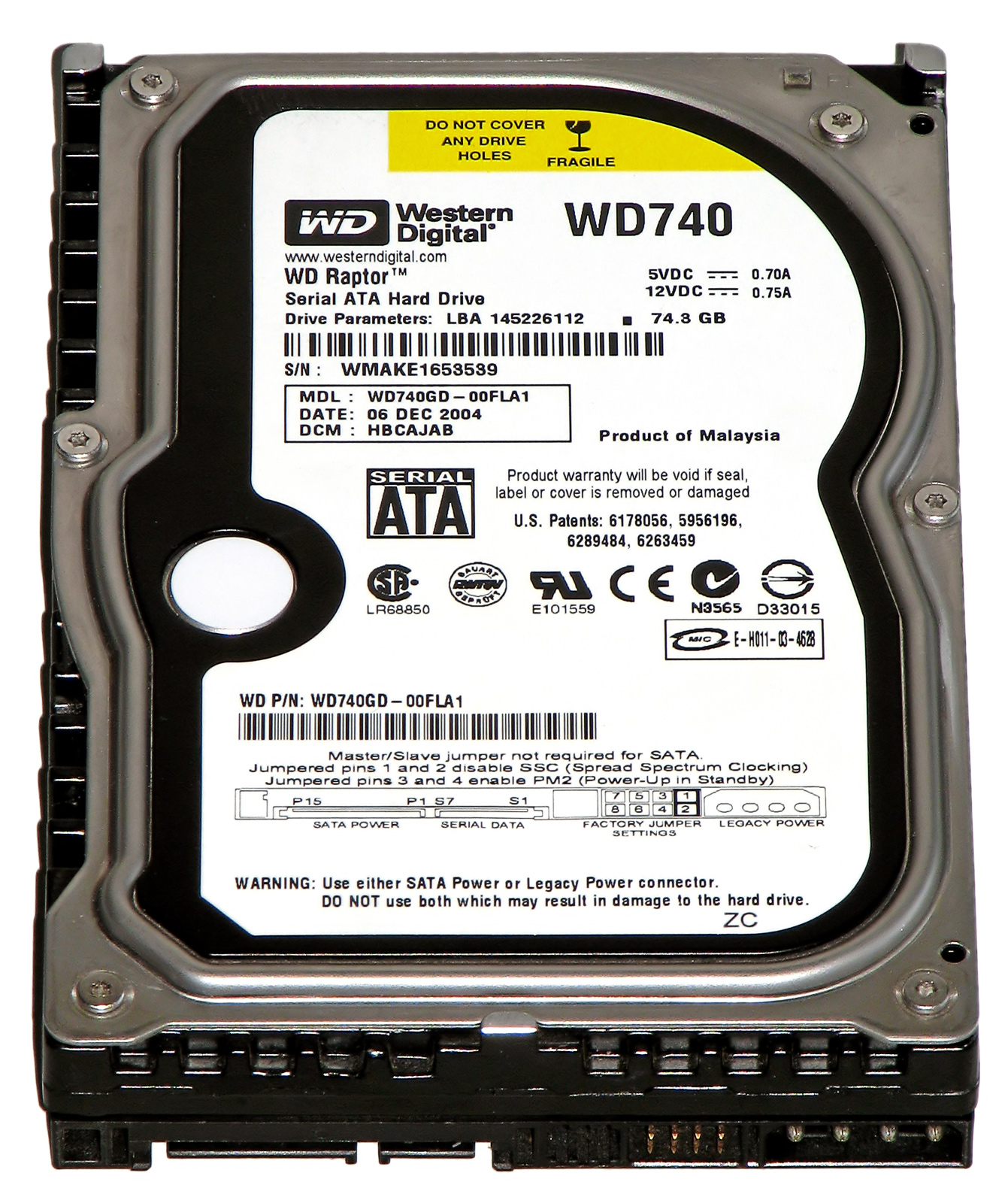
Western Digital WD740GD

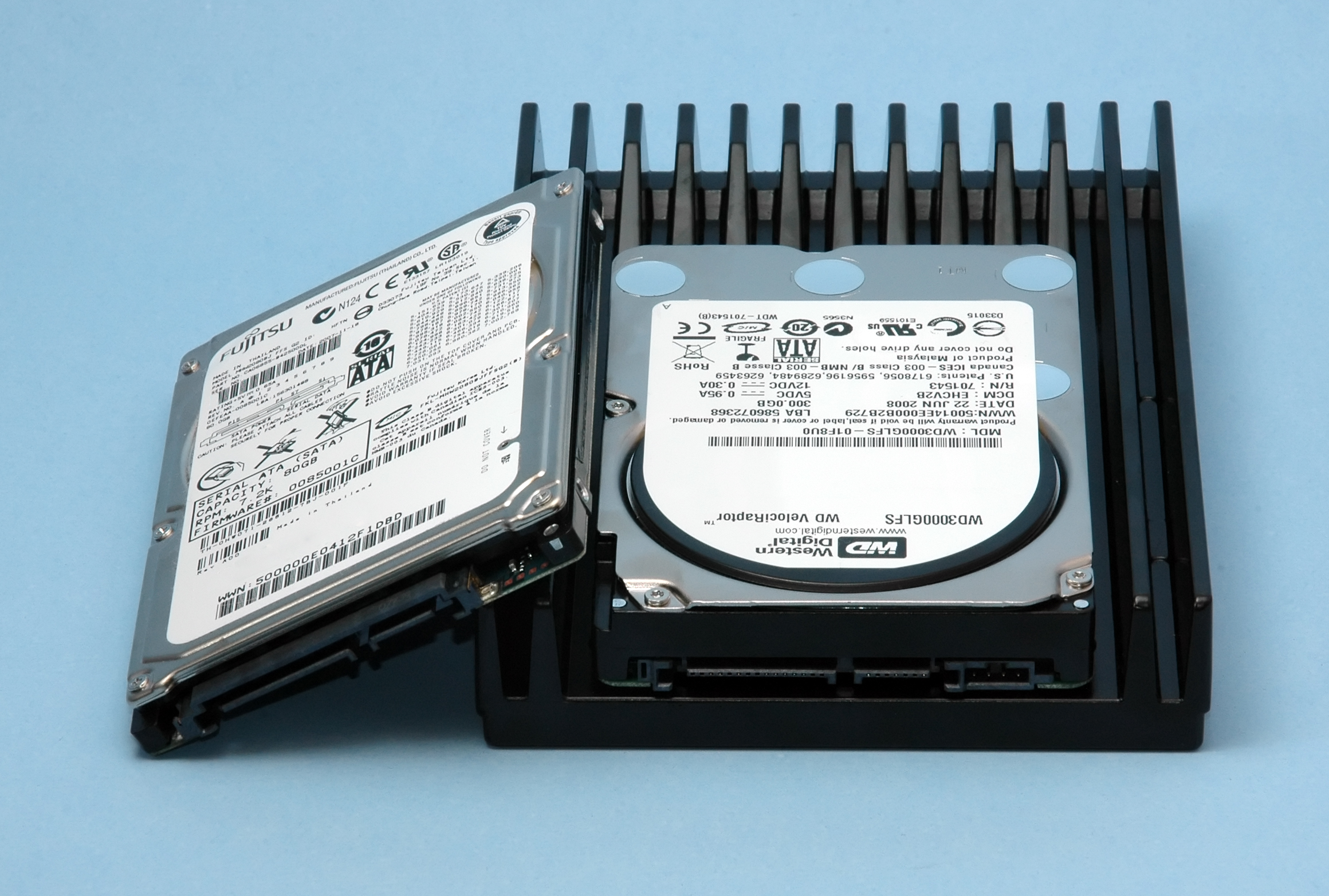
A Fujitsu laptop drive (80 GB, 7,200 RPM) on the left and a Western Digital VelociRaptor (300 GB, 10,000 RPM)

The Western Digital Raptor (often marketed as WD Raptor, 2.5" models known as VelociRaptor) is a discontinued series of high performance hard disk drives produced by Western Digital, and marketed from 2003 until 2016. The drive occupied a niche in the enthusiast, workstation and small-server market though they never reached mainstream adoption and popularity. Traditionally, the majority of servers used hard drives featuring a SCSI interface because of their advantages in both performance and reliability over consumer-level ATA drives, as well as compatibility with standard computers which lack SCSI ports.

Although pitched as an "enterprise-class drive", it won favor with the PC gaming and niche enthusiast community because the drive was capable of speeds usually found only on more expensive SCSI drives due to its 10000rpm speed. Adopting the SATA interface meant that it could be used easily on all modern motherboards with no separate host adapter card. Also, integration was made easier still by the inclusion of a standard 4-pin Molex power connector in addition to the standard SATA power port. This, however, was available only in 3.5" models.

Despite having been in production for many years from early 2003 until mid 2016, there was no direct competition in the same market for years and these drives did not become mainstream instead the vast majority of desktops stuck with 7200rpm drives for cost and power usage efficiency. The rise of affordable SSDs has made this drive obsolete leaving only 7200rpm drives as the main drive in computers today.

In 2006, Western Digital acknowledged the primary consumer of its Raptor brand drives by releasing a revision of its 150 GB drive. In keeping with the PC case modding trend of stylizing, the drive was given a Perspex window to match the internals of computer cases. This allows the user to see the drive's inner workings while it is in operation.

== History ==
On February 10, 2003, Western Digital announced the first consumer 10,000 RPM hard drive, sold in 36 GB and 74 GB versions.

On April 21, 2008, Western Digital announced the next generation of its 10,000 RPM SATA Raptor hard drive series. The new drives, called WD VelociRaptor, feature 300 GB capacity and 2.5-inch platters enclosed in the IcePack, a 3.5-inch mounting frame with a built-in heat sink. Western Digital claimed that the new drives were 35 percent faster than the previous generation Raptors.

On April 6, 2010, Western Digital updated the VelociRaptor series. These drives contain up to three platters and a 600 GB total capacity, upgraded from the dual-platter 300 GB design of the prior flagship model. Western Digital claims the new models are 15 percent faster than the previous generation of VelociRaptors.

On April 16, 2012, Western Digital updated the VelociRaptor series for the second time. The new drives contain up to three platters and a 1000 GB total capacity, upgraded from the triple-platter 600 GB design of the prior flagship model. It was the last generation of Raptor hard drives to be manufactured; Western Digital removed it from its product catalog in mid-2016, without any direct successor.

Alongside VelociRaptor, Western Digital also produced the S25, rebranded XE in May 2012, which is a SAS version of VelociRaptor. It was first launched on November 3, 2009 with capacities of 147 and 300 GB, which are similar to competing drives from other manufacturers. They were later expanded to 450 and 600 GB in January 2011, and to 900 GB in March 2012. XE was removed from Western Digital's product catalog before VelociRaptor, in March 2015.

== Models ==
=== EL36 ===
In 2003, Western Digital released the first incarnation of the Raptor series: the WD360GD. It featured a capacity of 37 GB on a single platter, a Serial ATA interface, and was the first ATA drive to operate at a spindle speed of 10,000 rpm. Like many early SATA drives, the Raptor was not a "real" SATA drive because it was really a PATA drive that used an 88i8030C interface bridge chip from Marvell. However, this fact did not significantly hamper the Raptor's performance. WD360GD Raptors do not use the 3.3 V Serial ATA power line.

As is usually the case for hard drives featuring a faster spindle speed, the Raptor outperformed other ATA drives and in some situations was even able to reach the performance of contemporary 10,000 rpm SCSI drives. SCSI drives still outperformed the Raptor in multi-user scenarios, but for high-end home computers it fared very well. For enthusiasts' systems, the Raptor also had the key advantages of low noise and temperature levels compared to similarly performing drives.

All WD360GD drives with Part Number WD360GD-00FNA0 (December 2003) and earlier cannot accept SATA latch cables, as the SATA data connector does not have the required rails. Therefore, only normal cables can be plugged into these connectors.

WD360GD Raptors with the Marvell 88i8030-TBC PATA to SATA bridge chip, such as WD360GD-00FNA0 (December 2003) and earlier, are limited to UDMA 5 transfers. In Linux, "applying bridge limits" is displayed and then it allows transfers up to UDMA/100. In Microsoft Windows, they are reported as UDMA 6, but give a burst rate of 104 MB/s, while WD360GD with the 88i8030-TBC1 chip are reported as UDMA 6 and give a burst rate of 122 MB/s, close to the theoretical limit of UDMA 6. Those Raptors limited at UDMA 5 were marketed as supporting SATA I 150 MB/s, but they only support the legacy PATA UDMA 5 at 100 MB/s.

Like its larger brother the WD740GD, the WD360GD was revised in 2006 and released with the designation WD360ADFD – incorporating twice as much on-board cache (16 MB vs 8 MB), at least one side of a single platter that offers twice the areal density, and enabling Native Command Queuing (NCQ).

=== EL74 ===
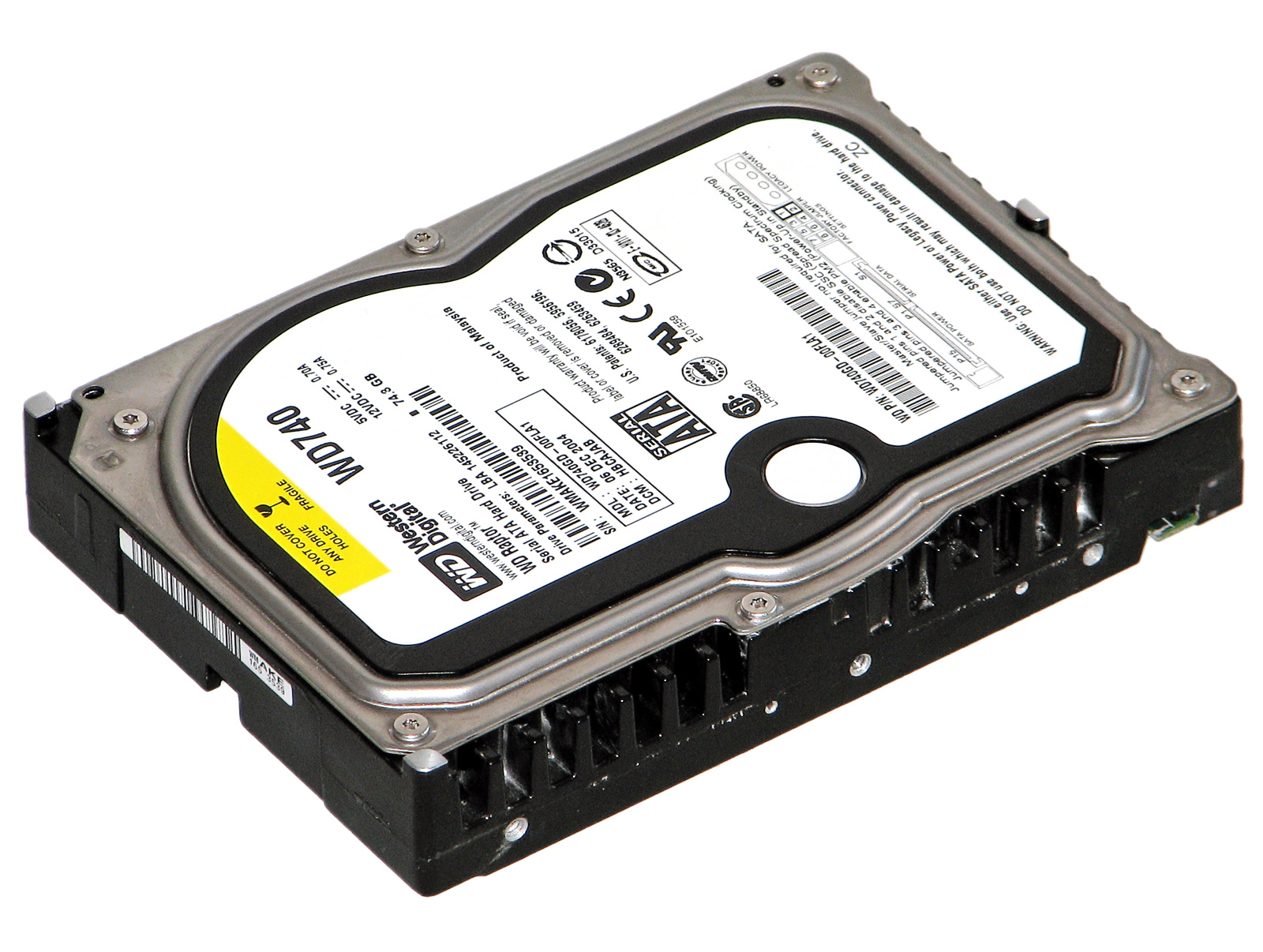
Western Digital WD740

The second generation Raptor was introduced in early 2004, featuring two platters for 74 GB of storage space. Unlike its predecessor, the WD740GD did not use ball bearings to support the spinning disks, but instead used fluid dynamic bearings. These allowed the new Raptor to operate at a noise level comparable to the quieter 7,200 rpm drives.

Another advantage the WD740GD had over its predecessor was Tagged Command Queuing, a feature that had previously been available only in SCSI drives. Command queuing resulted in a notable increase in the WD740GD's multi-user performance—a key discipline where its predecessor failed compared to SCSI drives. However, enabling command queuing on the WD740GD resulted in a performance decrease in single-user scenarios. It is worth noting that as of 2005, only a few SATA controllers could fully support command queuing. This drive became immensely popular in high-end gaming systems because of these features.

In 2006 Western Digital revised the WD740GD specification and released the WD740ADFD, ostensibly the same drive but with 16 MB of on-board cache, and a larger single platter (one 75 GB platter vs two 37 GB platters). Support for TCQ (rarely supported on SATA RAID controllers) was dropped in favor of NCQ, and the internal Parallel ATA controller was replaced with a native SATA interface, eliminating the PATA-to-SATA bridge controller chip. Unfortunately one of the major enhancements of WD740ADFD, the NCQ, is implemented so badly in the WD740ADFD-00NLR1 that it has been added to the Linux libata drive blacklist. This did not apply for the WD740GD because it uses TCQ and not NCQ. In order to deal with it, NCQ is disabled Link to the NCQ-Bug in the Kernel Bug Tracker. With TCQ capable controllers, the WD740GD is possibly faster than its successor as some of the gains of the WD740ADFD are lost. The WD740ADFD has also caused problems with some motherboards and their manufacturers had to release BIOS updates.

=== EL150 ===
The third generation Raptor was released by Western Digital in January 2006. It features two 75 GB platters (for a total of 150 GB) and a more advanced system of Native Command Queuing. At the same time, the Raptor X was released. It has identical specifications to the standard Raptor, but it has the addition of a clear polycarbonate window in the drive cover, making the movements of the disks and magnetic heads visible. This unique feature is likely to be popular with case modders. Like the regular Raptor, the Raptor X has a MTBF rating of 1.2 million hours, or 137 years. Both drives are covered by a five-year warranty. While this drive uses the NCQ feature of SATA II, it lacks support for the increased bandwidth of SATA II (3 Gbit/s).

=== VR150M ===
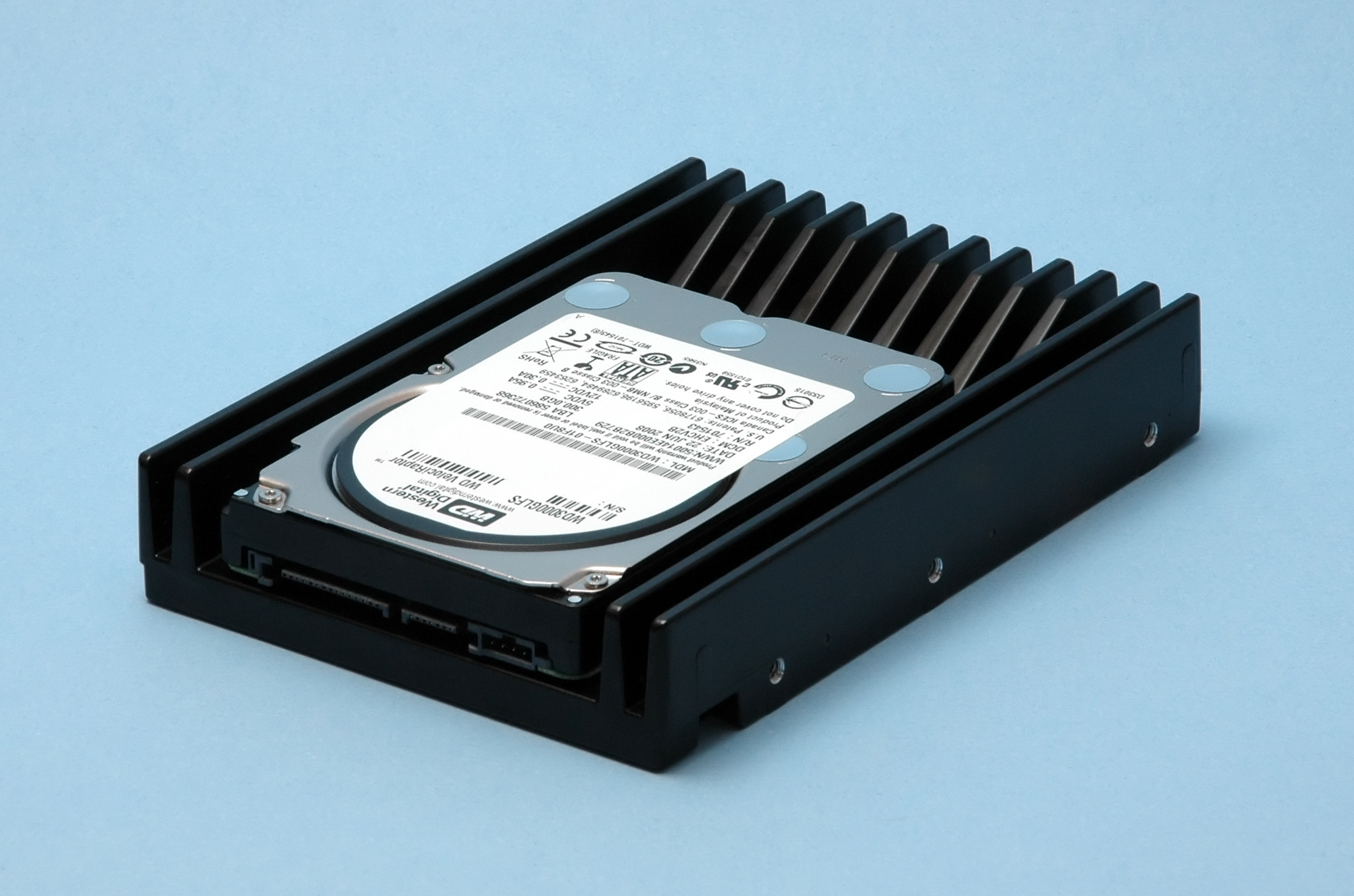
An early-edition GLFS model

The fourth-generation Raptor was announced by Western Digital in April 2008. It is marketed under the VelociRaptor name. As well as increasing the capacity to 300 GB (split over two 150 GB platters), the form factor is as follows:

- GLFS models – 2.5-inch drive in a 3.5-inch IcePack frame (serving as a heatsink)
- HLFS models – 2.5-inch drive in a redesigned 3.5-inch IcePack with proper SATA connector position (see below)
- BLFS models – 2.5-inch bare drives (incompatible with notebooks)

Earlier GLFS models have been criticised for being incompatible with 3.5-inch SATA hot swap bays due to the position of the connectors; however, a new revision (HLFS models) has been released which remedies this problem. Furthermore, time-limited error recovery (TLER) has been enabled by default on HLFS models.

Western Digital later released a 2.5-inch VelociRaptor (BLFS model suffix) which is nearly identical to the 3.5-inch version, but without the IcePack heat sink. These drives are designed for use in servers and are unsuitable for laptops because of their power requirements and 15 mm thickness. TLER is also enabled by default on BLFS models.

A severe issue with the fourth generation of Raptor hard drives was faulty firmware, which caused the drive to report TLER timeouts after approximately 50 days of continuous operation (precisely 49.71 days counted in milliseconds, which corresponds to the overflow of a 32-bit number). The bug has been present in all models of drives shipped, from their introduction up to late 2009. WDC never admitted the existence of this bug, or officially released a firmware update; however, an update was leaked by a WDC technician and is still readily available through various download sites. The bug was of minor significance for desktop users, but prolonged drive operation in RAID setups could result in mass drive dropouts after 49.71 days, causing maintenance problems and potentially data loss.

=== VR200M ===
The fifth-generation Raptor (or second-generation VelociRaptor) was announced in April 2010. Besides increasing the total capacity to 600 GB, the SATA interface speed had been increased to 6 Gbit/s. The drives are sold either in the same IcePack mounting frame as the previous generation, or as bare drives (intended for rackmount servers). While the drive width of 2.5 inches may entice users to try to install a VelociRaptor drive in a laptop, this is not possible. Not only are the drives a thicker-than-usual 15 mm high, they require both +12 V and +5 V power that most laptops cannot provide. Standard laptop hard drives typically only require +5 V, and are of 7 or 9.5 mm thickness.

=== VR333M ===
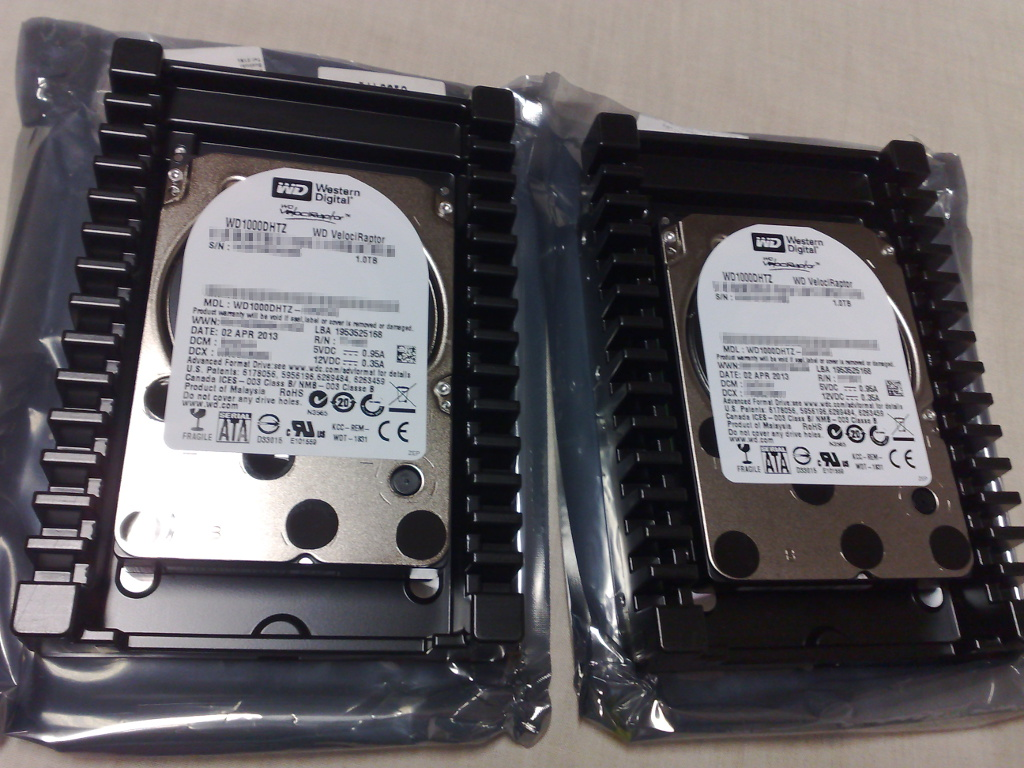
Two third-generation (VR333M) 1 TB VelociRaptors in IcePack mounting frames

The sixth-generation Raptor (or third-generation VelociRaptor) was announced by Western Digital in April 2012. The drives are 2.5-inch devices with 15 mm in height, sold either as bare drives (CHTZ and BHTZ models) or mounted in the IcePack 3.5-inch mounting frame (DHTZ and HHTZ models), which continues the variants available in the previous generation. Beside increasing the capacity to 1000 GB, the buffer size has been doubled to 64 MB. They are also the first Raptor models employing the Advanced Format (AF) 512e internal layout.

=== Models ===
Model no.	Gen.	Released	Capacity	Cache	Interface	Feature set	Sector Size	Notes	Product Page
WD360GD	1	2003	36 GB	8 MB	Parallel ATA to Serial ATA bridge	–	512 bytes	–	Specifications
WD740GD	2	2004	74 GB	8 MB	Parallel ATA to Serial ATA bridge	TCQ	512 bytes	–	Specifications
WD360ADFD	3	2006	36 GB	16 MB	Native SATA 1.5 Gbit/s	NCQ	512 bytes	–	Specifications
WD740ADFD	3	2006	74 GB	16 MB	Native SATA 1.5 Gbit/s	NCQ	512 bytes	–	Specifications
WD1500ADFD	3	2006	150 GB	16 MB	Native SATA 1.5 Gbit/s	NCQ	512 bytes	–	Specifications
WD1500AHFD	3	2006	150 GB	16 MB	Native SATA 1.5 Gbit/s	NCQ	512 bytes	Raptor X variant	Specifications
WD740HLFS	4	2008	74 GB	16 MB	Native SATA 3 Gbit/s	NCQ	512 bytes	VelociRaptor	TBA
WD800HLFS	4	2008	80 GB	16 MB	Native SATA 3 Gbit/s	NCQ	512 bytes	VelociRaptor	TBA
WD1500BLFS	4	2008	150 GB	16 MB	Native SATA 3 Gbit/s	NCQ	512 bytes	VelociRaptor	Specifications
WD1500HLFS	4	2008	150 GB	16 MB	Native SATA 3 Gbit/s	NCQ	512 bytes	VelociRaptor	Specifications
WD3000BLFS	4	2008	300 GB	16 MB	Native SATA 3 Gbit/s	NCQ	512 bytes	VelociRaptor	Specifications
WD3000GLFS	4	2008	300 GB	16 MB	Native SATA 3 Gbit/s	NCQ	512 bytes	VelociRaptor	Specifications
WD3000HLFS	4	2008	300 GB	16 MB	Native SATA 3 Gbit/s	NCQ	512 bytes	VelociRaptor	Specifications
WD3000HLHX	5	2010	300 GB	32 MB	Native SATA 6 Gbit/s	NCQ	512 bytes	VelociRaptor	Specifications
WD4500BLHX	5	2010	450 GB	32 MB	Native SATA 6 Gbit/s	NCQ	512 bytes	VelociRaptor	Specifications
WD4500HLHX	5	2010	450 GB	32 MB	Native SATA 6 Gbit/s	NCQ	512 bytes	VelociRaptor	Specifications
WD6000BLHX	5	2010	600 GB	32 MB	Native SATA 6 Gbit/s	NCQ	512 bytes	VelociRaptor	Specifications
WD6000HLHX	5	2010	600 GB	32 MB	Native SATA 6 Gbit/s	NCQ	512 bytes	VelociRaptor	Specifications
WD1500HLHX	5	2011	150 GB	32 MB	Native SATA 6 Gbit/s	NCQ	512 bytes	VelociRaptor	Specifications
WD1600HLHX	5	2011	160 GB	32 MB	Native SATA 6 Gbit/s	NCQ	512 bytes	VelociRaptor	Specifications
WD3000HLHX	5	2011	300 GB	32 MB	Native SATA 6 Gbit/s	NCQ	512 bytes	VelociRaptor	Specifications
WD6000HLHX	5	2011	600 GB	32 MB	Native SATA 6 Gbit/s	NCQ	512 bytes	VelociRaptor	Specifications
WD2500HHTZ	6	2012	250 GB	64 MB	Native SATA 6 Gbit/s	NCQ	4096 bytes	VelociRaptor	Specifications
WD5000HHTZ	6	2012	500 GB	64 MB	Native SATA 6 Gbit/s	NCQ	4096 bytes	VelociRaptor	Specifications
WD1000DHTZ	6	2012	1000 GB	64 MB	Native SATA 6 Gbit/s	NCQ	4096 bytes	VelociRaptor	Specifications
Special models
WD800GD	2	2004	80 GB	8 MB	Parallel ATA to Serial ATA bridge	TCQ	512 bytes	–	[Original link no longer available]
WD800ADFD	3	2006	80 GB	16 MB	Native SATA 1.5 Gbit/s	NCQ	512 bytes	Initially HP/Dell-exclusive; now retailed	Specifications
WD800ADFS	3	2006	80 GB	16 MB	Native SATA 3 Gbit/s	NCQ	512 bytes	Initially HP/Dell-exclusive; now retailed	Official site
WD1600ADFS	3	2006	160 GB	16 MB	Native SATA 3 Gbit/s	NCQ	512 bytes	Initially HP/Dell-exclusive; now retailed	Specifications
WD800HLFS	4	2008	80 GB	16 MB	Native SATA 3 Gbit/s	NCQ	512 bytes	Initially HP/Dell-exclusive; now retailed	Specifications
WD1600HLFS	4	2008	160 GB	16 MB	Native SATA 3 Gbit/s	NCQ	512 bytes	HP/Dell-exclusive	Specifications
