= IO Accelerator =

IO Accelerator/PCIe IO Accelerator
- Connects to: Type 1 or 2 c-Class Mezzanine slot and PCIe slots via: PCI Express ×4 Gen 1, ×8 Gen 1 (Duo), ×4 Gen 2 (Duo)
- Manufacturer: Hewlett-Packard
- Introduced: March 2, 2009
- Type: Solid-state drive

The HP StorageWorks IO Accelerator is a type of solid-state drive in a mezzanine card form factor for HP's BladeSystem c-Class servers. This product was announced by HP on March 2, 2009. The follow-on product, the HP StorageWorks PCIe IO Accelerator for Proliant Servers is a standard PCIe form factor, and is supported in a variety of Proliant DL and ML servers.

== Specifications ==
The mezzanine adapter connects to the blade server using a PCI Express ×4 link, uses less than 9 watts, has bandwidth up to 800 MB/s and latency as low as 50 microseconds.

The PCIe adapter connects to the server using a PCI Express version 1.0 ×4 link, ×8 link, or version 2.0 ×4 link, depending on model.

The IO Accelerator was initially offered in capacities of 80 GB, 160 GB, and 320 GB. The 320 GB model uses MLC NAND, whereas the other two models used SLC NAND. The 80 GB and 160 GB are now discontinued, and a new 640 GB model has been introduced. Newer models use MLC NAND.

The PCIe IO Accelerator is offered in 160 GB, 320 GB, 640 GB, and 1.28 TB capacities. It comes in two form factors: ioDrive or ioDrive Duo (two ioDrives on one PCIe card). The 160 GB is available in SLC NAND only, the 320 GB is available as either SLC Duo or MLC, and the 640 GB and 1.28 TB are both MLC Duo models.

Since the IO Accelerator is a Type-1 mezzanine card, the user can install up to 2 in a half-height blade server such as the BL460c, and up to 3 can be installed in a full-height blade server like the BL685c.

== Architecture ==
The IO Accelerators contain technology obtained from the company Fusion-io.

The adapter combines NAND flash memory (either SLC or MLC) with a custom controller (beneath the heat sink) that interfaces directly to the PCI Express fabric of the server. The card has 25 channels of NAND Flash that are accessed in parallel.

Medusa Labs performance testing was performed on Red Hat Enterprise Linux 5.2 using the IOzone benchmark tool.

== Limitations ==
The IO Accelerator cannot be used as boot media. Drivers are only available for Linux and Windows. Only 64-bit operating systems using the x86_64 processor architecture are supported.

== See also ==
- Solid-state drive
- BladeSystem
