= Don Basile =

American businessman

Donald Basile
- Education: Stanford University, Ph.D. & M.S. in Electrical Engineering
- Occupation: High Tech Investor
- Known for: President of Lenfest (1993–1997); Senior Director of Netfish (1999–2000); CEO of Fusion-io (2008–2009); CEO of Violin Memory (2009–2014)

Don Basile is an entrepreneur and high tech investor best known for his work in the fields of technology, healthcare, and telecommunications.

Don Basile currently serves as an investor in multiple companies He is a contributing author at Tech Crunch and The Next Web.

== Education ==
Basile earned an MS and PhD in Electrical Engineering from Stanford University in 1988 and 1993, respectively.

== Career ==
Basile is an investor in Cumulus Logic, Liqipel, Calient Technologies, RiverMeadow Software, and Sureline Systems.

In 2006, Basile became the Chairman of the Board at Fusion-io and became CEO two years later, where he convinced Apple co-founder Steve Wozniak to come on as chief scientist. In his first year as CEO, the company achieved over $10M in sales and earned a Red Herring Global 100 award. After leading Fusion-io through A and B rounds of funding, Basile transitioned to Violin Memory, as their CEO.

Basile led Violin to raise over $400m, and announced a strategic partnership with Toshiba Corporation, the inventor of NAND flash. After more than four years of collaboration, Violin terminated Basile.

Basile spent nearly four years as vice-president and managing director of Raza Foundries, Inc. (RFI), a broadband networking and communications investment company. Prior to RFI, he served as Director of Operations and Partnerships at Remarq Communities, Inc. formerly known as Supernews, an Internet infrastructure provider that provided cloud services to Excite, eBay, Lycos, Amazon and other internet brands. Basile also held management positions at Netfish Technologies, Inc., a leader in XML ecommerce; Lenfest Communications, a pioneer in the cable television industry; and UnitedHealth Group, a diversified managed health care company, which he helped grow from $560M to $1.2B.
