= Actifio =

American data management company, acquired by Google in 2020

- Type: Private
- Industry: Information Technology
- Founded: 2009
- Defunct: 2020
- Fate: Acquired by Google (2020)
- Headquarters: Waltham, Massachusetts
- Key people: Ash Ashutosh, Founder and CEO
- Parent: Google LLC
- Website: http://actifio.com/

Actifio was a privately held information technology firm headquartered in Waltham, Massachusetts. The company specialised in copy data virtualisation, that they claimed made information technology infrastructure more efficient by reducing unnecessary duplication of data. On 3 December 2020, Google announced it intended to acquire Actifio for an undisclosed sum; the acquisition closed on 14 December 2020. Actifio's technology subsequently became the foundation of Google Clouds Backup and Disaster Recovery service.

== Technology ==
Actifio's marketing claimed their product reduced unnecessary duplication of application data by maintaining a single "golden master" copy of production data, from which unlimited virtual instances could be generated on demand. They stated that their technology maintained data integrity while ensuring rapid access throughout the data's entire life cycle. They sold on the idea that rather than deploying multiple siloed data protection applications, their system provided virtualised data management, reducing storage costs and improving operational efficiency.

Their core technology was their patented Virtual Data Pipeline (VDP), which captured application data at block level in its native format, managed a single physical copy, and served unlimited virtual copies for instant access, backup, disaster recovery, and test and development purposes.

In July 2014, Actifio introduced Resiliency Director, an automated disaster recovery tool. During a test conducted by Sungard Availability Services, they reported that hundreds of virtual machines were recovered in under 20 minutes.

=== Copy data ===
Copy data consists of multiple copies of the same file. This data usually came in the form of multiple copies of the same data for backups, test and dev plus online copies for disaster recovery. Actifio conducted joint research with IDC to understand the copy data problem in depth. The report IDC produced claimed that about 75% of enterprise data storage is consumed by copy data and estimated that businesses would spend roughly $44 billion on managing copy data in 2013.

Actifio was one of the first firms to enter the copy data management (CDM) market and was followed by companies like Rubrik and Cohesity.

== History ==
=== Founding ===
In July 2009, Ash Ashutosh founded Actifio in Waltham, Massachusetts, with four employees. Ashutosh founded the company after previously serving as Vice President and Chief Technologist at HP's StorageWorks division, a position he got after his venture, AppIQ, which was acquired by HP in 2005. The company launched its first product in the autumn of 2011.

In 2012, Gartner recognised Actifio in their Cool Vendor report, noting that its products facilitated cloud-based and off-site storage without the need to build secondary data centres. That same year, Actifio was described as the fastest-growing storage startup. As of May 2012, approximately a quarter of the company's revenue came from Europe.

=== Funding ===
On 21 July 2010, Actifio announced that it had secured $8 million in series A funding. This round was led by North Bridge Venture Partners and Greylock Partners. Jamie Goldstein, general partner at North Bridge said, "Actifio has all the ingredients for success including a hot market opportunity, technological superiority, and a stellar executive team that will allow Actifio to deliver on the promise of Data Management Virtualization."

On 30 September 2010, Actifio announced that it had closed on $16 million in series B funding. This round of funding was led by Advanced Technology Ventures (ATV) with participation by North Bridge Venture Partners and Greylock Partners. It brought Actifio's total venture capital funding to $24 million.

In 2011, Actifio received $33 million in Series C funding led by Andreessen Horowitz. This firm, headed by Marc Andreessen and Ben Horowitz, has also funded Facebook, Zynga, and Twitter. Actifio had just started looking for its next round of funding when Peter Levine, a partner at Andreessen Horowitz, called to merely ask about Actifio's location. Actifio closed on funding nine days later. Levine said he did the deal because he believes Actifio will "dominate a large segment of the backup and storage space." North Bridge Venture Partners, Greylock Partners, and Advanced Technology Ventures also invested in this round of funding. After completing its Series C funding, Actifio had received a total of $57 million in venture capital.

During Actifio's $50 million Series D round, media reported that investors valued the company at $500 million. After completing its Series D funding the firm had received $108 million in venture capital.

On 23 March 2014, Actifio announced that it had raised another $100 million in series E funding from Tiger Global Management, Andreessen Horowitz, Greylock Partners, North Bridge Venture Partners, Advanced Technology Ventures, and Technology Crossover Ventures that increased its implied valuation to $1.1 billion. This money came in the form of primary funding with no secondary liquidity for employees or earlier shareholders. Ashutosh said that $125 million could have been raised but that some money had been turned away. $75 million closed on 14 March and the rest on 7 April. After this round of funding, Actifio had raised $207.5 million in capital. In August 2018, Actifio took in another $100 million.

=== Reverse stock split ===
In October 2020 media reports claimed that Actifio had implemented a reverse stock split at a ratio of 100,000-to-one, effectively eliminating the shareholdings of up to 1,000 current and former employees. They reports that the split left Actifio's common stock valued at approximately $2.3 million in aggregate, despite the company having been valued at more than $1 billion by venture capitalists in 2018 and having raised $311.5 million in total funding. The report quoted one former employee who had purchased vested shares for approximately $5,000 as receiving a total payout of less than one US cent. Actifio declined to comment on the matter.

=== Clients ===
Actifio clients included Time Warner Cable, Boston University Medical Campus, Navisite, the City of South Portland, Unilever, IBM, Netflix, and many other organisations. As of October 2012, Actifio had about 180 clients and its deals averaged a value of about $250,000. By March 2013, Actifio had over 300 clients in 31 countries paying an average of $349,000 per three-year contract. The data under Actifio management at this time was over 1 exabyte, with 14 petabytes of active application data, and 55 petabytes of physical storage capacity. As of July 2014, there were about 400 Actifio clients worldwide, including both large multinationals and cloud service providers.

==== IBM OEM ====
Actifio and IBM announced an OEM agreement on 5 February 2019. This allowed IBM to sell an IBM-branded version of Actifio software as IBM InfoSphere Virtual Data Pipeline (VDP). IBM withdrew the product from marketing on 1 January 2026.

== Acquisition by Google ==
On 3 December 2020, Google announced it intended to acquire Actifio for an undisclosed sum; the acquisition closed on 14 December 2020. At the time of the acquisition, Actifio notified Massachusetts state authorities that it was laying off 54 workers in that state; the total number of redundancies in other regions where Actifio had employees remained unclear.

Google integrated Actifio's technology into Google Cloud, where it became the basis for the Google Cloud Backup and Disaster Recovery service. The platform supports a range of enterprise workloads, including SAP HANA, Oracle, Microsoft SQL Server, PostgreSQL, and MySQL, as well as virtual machines running on VMware, Hyper-V, and Google Compute Engine.

== Legal disputes ==
=== Delphix ===
On 4 October 2013, Delphix filed a patent infringement lawsuit against Actifio in the United States District Court for the Northern District of California (case no. 13-cv-04613-BLF), alleging that Actifio's copy data storage products infringed five of its patents. Actifio counter-sued Delphix in California, asserting infringement of two of its own patents, and separately filed suit against Delphix in the District of Massachusetts on 6 August 2014 (case no. 14-cv-13247-DJC). Actifio also filed petitions for inter partes review (IPR) of nearly all claims of all five Delphix patents before the Patent Trial and Appeal Board (PTAB). On 12 May 2016, the PTAB invalidated a Delphix patent covering storage and database virtualisation techniques in an America Invents Act review, finding that Actifio had demonstrated the challenged claims to be unpatentable.

=== Rubrik ===
On 30 June 2020, Actifio filed a patent infringement lawsuit against Rubrik in federal court in Delaware, alleging that Rubrik's "Brik" appliances and Cloud Data Management software infringed four Actifio patents relating to copy data management technologies: U.S. Patents 6,732,244; 6,959,369; 9,495,435; and 10,013,313. Actifio sought injunctive relief and monetary damages. Rubrik disputed the claims and stated its intention to defend the lawsuit vigorously.
