= Fusion-io =

American technology company

- Type: Subsidiary
- Industry: Solid-state drive
- Founded: 2005; 21 years ago
- Defunct: July 2014; 12 years ago (acquired by SanDisk)
- Headquarters: San Jose, California, Cottonwood Heights, Utah, U.S.
- Key people: Shane Robison (President and CEO); Steve Wozniak (Chief Scientist)
- Products: Hardware: ioScale; ioDrive2; ioDrive2 Duo; ioControl; ioFX; Software: VSL; ioSphere; ioMemory SDK; ioTurbine; ION Data Accelerator; ioVDI
- Parent: SanDisk Corporation (Western Digital)

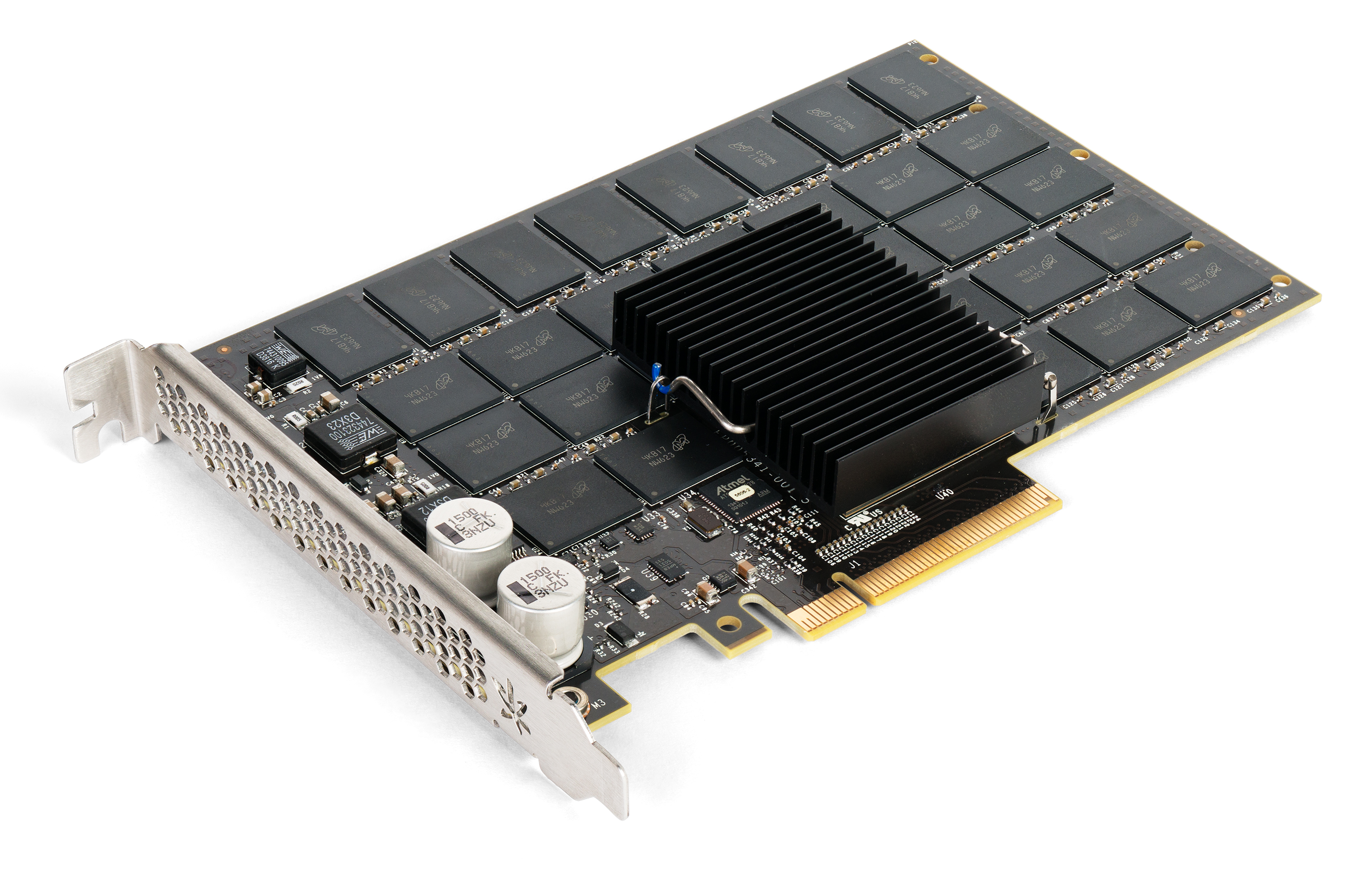
SanDisk Fusion ioMemory PX600-5200: 5.2TB FH/HL PCI-E SSD.

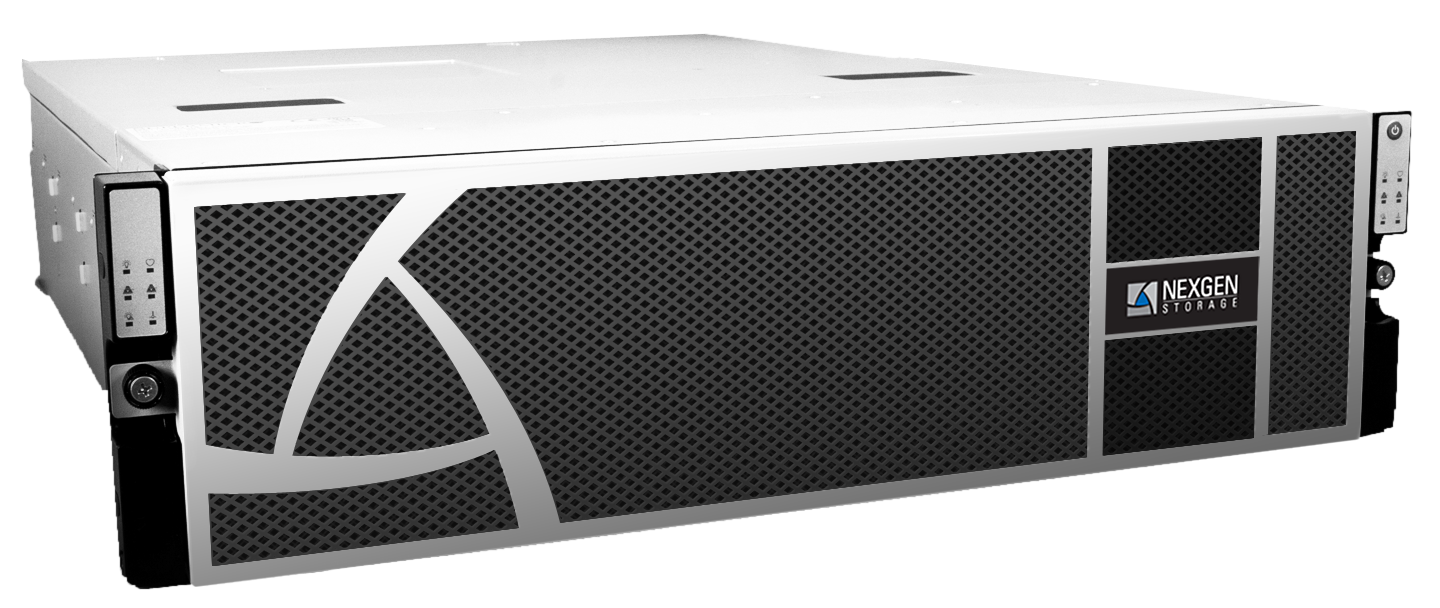
NexGen n5 in 2012, renamed ioControl hybrid storage

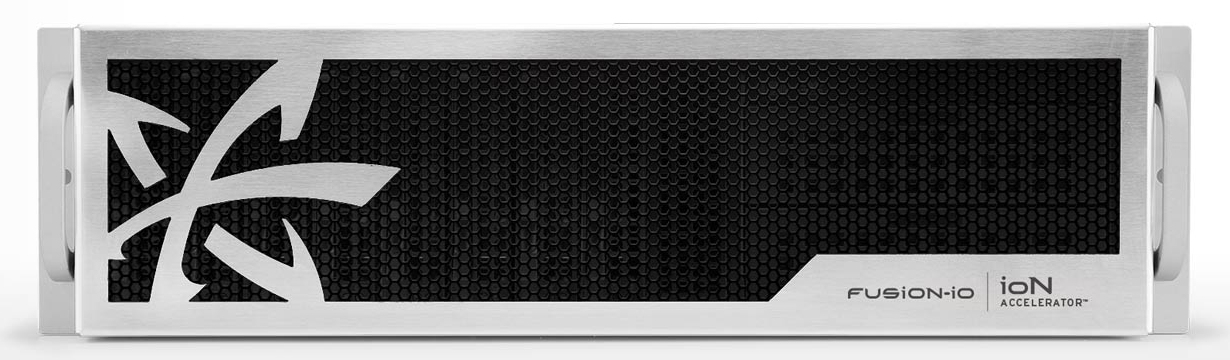
ION Accelerator

Fusion-io, Inc. was a computer hardware and software systems company (acquired by SanDisk Corporation in 2014) based in Cottonwood Heights, Utah, that designed and manufactured products using flash memory technology. The Fusion ioMemory was marketed for applications such as databases, virtualization, cloud computing, big data. Their ioDrive product was considered around 2011 to be one of the fastest storage devices on the market.

== History ==
The company was founded in December 2005 as Canvas Technologies in Nevada. Co-founders were David Flynn and Rick White. The company was based in Cottonwood Heights, Utah, near Salt Lake City. In June 2006, the company name was changed to Fusion Multisystems, Incorporated. A product with the brand name ioDrive was demonstrated and announced in September 2007.

In March 2008, Fusion-io raised $19 million in a series A round of funding from a group of investors led by New Enterprise Associates. David Flynn was chief technology officer, while Don Basile was chief executive officer at the time. Michael Dell invested in Fusion-io during this round. It was chosen as an "innovation up-and-comer" in an online Business Week poll by early 2009.

In 2009 and 2010, David Bradford, served as CEO. In February 2009, Fusion-io hired Apple Inc. co-founder Steve Wozniak as chief scientist. It was chosen by Red Herring magazine as a "top 100" company in February 2009. In March 2009, Fusion-io started working with HP on the IO Accelerator, a new high-performance solid-state drive.

Fusion-io announced $47.5 million in a series B round of investment led by Lightspeed Venture Partners in April 2009. Hardware partner Samsung later invested in Fusion-io in October 2009.

A third round of funding led by Meritech Capital Partners, with additional capital from Accel Partners and Andreessen Horowitz, provided a total of $45 million in April 2010. It was named the second most promising information technology company by The Wall Street Journal in March 2010. In May 2010, the Linux block-io principal developer, Jens Axboe, joined Fusion-io after leaving Oracle.

Fusion-io first filed for an initial public offering (IPO) in March 2011, with shares to be listed on the New York Stock Exchange with symbol FIO. At the time, Facebook accounted for most of its revenues. In June 2011, Fusion-io announced it increased the price of its IPO to put the company's total value at $1.4 billion. The company had previously priced its shares to value the company at about $1.17 billion. The shares were offered on June 9, raising the valuation to about $2 billion.

On August 5, 2011, Fusion-io acquired IO Turbine for about $95 million. IO Turbine's main product was the ioTurbine hybrid array (caching to flash) software, which is virtualization-aware, particularly of VMware environments.

In January 2012, Fusion-io achieved a record breaking billion IOPS from eight servers at the DEMO Enterprise event in San Francisco.

In June 2012, the Btrfs principal developers Chris Mason joined Fusion-io after leaving Oracle, and Josef Bacik left Red Hat to join Fusion-io.

In August 2012, Fusion-io announced the ION Data Accelerator software. Since February 2014, the ION product is offered as an appliance instead of a software product.

In March 2013, Fusion-io acquired the Linux software defined storage firm ID7, developers of the SCST generic SCSI target layer.

At Storage Field Day 3, Fusion-io announced their acquisition of NexGen Storage in April 2013 for $114 million cash and $5 million in stock. NexGen was located in Louisville, Colorado and had a product it called n5, which it announced in November 2011 and upgraded in July 2012. The n5 was a hybrid product including hard disk drives as well as flash memory, aiming to provide more consistent performance guarantees than only disks. The n5 was renamed ioControl hybrid storage after acquisition.

In May 2013, the co-founders David Flynn (CEO) and Rick White (CMO) left. In October 2013, Dennis Wolff, its CFO, left. In November 2013, the Btrfs developers Chris Mason and Josef Bacik left Fusion-io for Facebook.

In 2012 and 2013, Fusion-io was criticized for depending too heavily on two major customers—Facebook and Apple. However, during the F2Q 2014 earnings call, it was made clear that in Q2 the orders of twelve customers exceeded $1 million each.

A scalable multi-queue block layer for the Linux kernel was developed by Fusion-io engineers Axboe and Shaohua Li, and merged into the Linux kernel mainline in kernel version 3.13, released on January 19, 2014. This new block layer uses parallelism (and thus provides much higher performance) offered by SSDs using NVM Express. With the release of Linux kernel version 3.13, only the virtioblk driver has been modified to actually use this new interface. A technical presentation paper of this new feature was published at ACM SYSTOR'13.

During the first half of 2014, Fusion-io sponsored conversion of the Linux kernel SCSI core to the blk-mq approach.

In January 2014, Jens Axboe announced he was leaving Fusion-io to join Facebook.

In June 2014, SanDisk announced its intentions to buy Fusion-io. for about USD $1.1 Billion. SanDisk completed its acquisition of Fusion-io in July 2014.

== Technology ==
Fusion-io called their architecture ioMemory. It was announced at the DEMO conference in 2007, and software called ioSAN was shown in 2008.

In March 2009, Hewlett-Packard announced the HP StorageWorks IO Accelerator adaptation of Fusion-io technology specifically for HP BladeSystem C-Series servers. IBM’s project Quicksilver, based on Fusion-io technology, showed that solid-state technology in 2008 could deliver 1 million IOPS. By September 2009, IBM offered a PCIe adapter, based on the ioDrive, for IBM servers. In December 2009, IBM announced it would license the technology for an appliance.
