= G.Skill =

Taiwanese computer hardware manufacturing company

G.SKILL International Enterprise Co., Ltd. 芝奇國際實業股份有限公司
- Type: Private
- Industry: Computer hardware
- Founded: 1989; 37 years ago
- Headquarters: Taipei, Taiwan
- Products: Computer memory Solid-state drive Flash memory cards
- Number of employees: 500
- Website: www.gskill.com

G.SKILL International Enterprise is a Taiwanese computer hardware manufacturing company. The company's target customers are overclocking computer users. It produces a variety of high-end PC products and is best known for its DRAM products.

== History ==
Based in Taiwan, G.SKILL corporation was established in 1989. In 2003, the company debuted as a maker of computer memory. The company currently operates through several distributors and resellers in North America, Europe, Asia, and Africa.

== Products ==
=== Memory ===
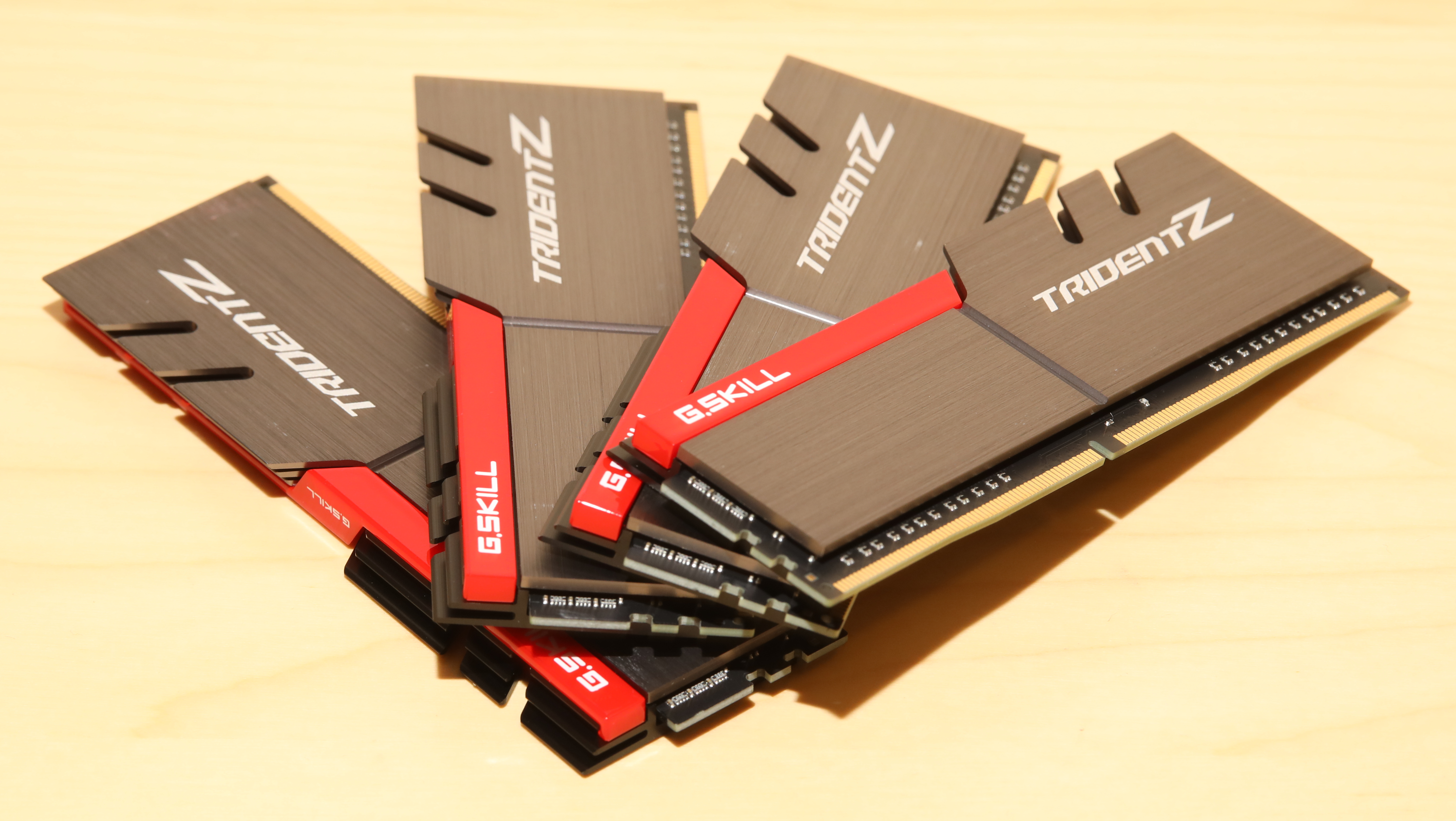
Four sticks of G.SKILL TridentZ Memory

G.SKILL is known for its range of DDR, DDR2, DDR3, DDR4 and DDR5 computer memory. RAM is available in single-channel, dual-channel, triple-channel and quad-channel packs for desktops, workstations, HTPC, as well as netbooks and laptops.

It was shown to be the only DDR4 manufacturer not vulnerable to the rowhammer security exploit.

The company does not manufacture the memory dies; it purchases the memory dies and assembles them into a DIMM memory module ready for sale to customers.

In February 2020, G.SKILL announced a DDR4 256 GB memory kit that, unusually for kits of that size at the time, operated at speeds above JEDEC specifications.

=== Solid-state drives ===
On 12 May 2008 G.SKILL announced its first SATA II 2.5" solid-state drives (SSDs) with 32 GB or 64 GB of capacity.

On 22 October 2014 G.SKILL released its first Extreme Performance Phoenix Blade Series 480 GB PCIe 2.0 x8 SSD using MLC NAND capable of maximum read and write speeds up to 2,000 MB per second and 245K IOPS.

The company has also produced flash cards in several formats including Secure Digital (SD) and MultiMediaCard (MMC) in addition to high capacity USB 2.0 and 3.0 flash drives.

=== Peripherals ===
==== Mechanical gaming keyboards ====
On 14 September 2015 G.SKILL announced the availability of the new RIPJAWS series' KM780 RGB and KM780 MX mechanical gaming keyboards with genuine Cherry MX key switches.

Announced on August 21, 2019, G.SKILL announced the KM360 mechanical keyboard with a $49.99 price tag and with Cherry MX red switches (the linear variant).

==== Laser gaming mouse ====
On 24 September 2015 G.SKILL released the new RIPJAWS series' MX780 customizable RGB laser gaming mouse.

== See also ==
- List of companies of Taiwan
