= Advanced Technology Ventures =

American venture capital firm

- Type: Private
- Industry: Venture capital
- Founded: 1979; 47 years ago
- Headquarters: Menlo Park, California, U.S.
- Products: Venture capital
- AUM: $1.8 billion
- Website: www.atvcapital.com

Advanced Technology Ventures (ATV) is an American venture capital firm with more than $1.8 billion in capital under management. The firm was founded in 1979 and invests in IT, healthcare, and cleantech companies. ATV is based in Menlo Park, California with offices in Waltham, Massachusetts.

== History ==
ATV was created when Dr. Thaddeus (Teddy) F. Walkowicz left Venrock, a venture capital firm associated with the Rockefeller family, to team up with Dr. Ivan Sutherland, George Kokkinakis and Dr. Robert Loewy. Together they founded Advanced Technology Ventures.

=== Investment funds ===
1981 - ATV I closes with $30.2M

1994 - ATV II closes with $28M

1988 - ATV III closes with $30.7M

1995 - ATV IV closes with $100M

1998 - ATV V closes with $175M

1999 - ATV VI closes with $400M

2001 - ATV VII closes with $720M

2007 - ATV VIII closes with $305M
