= Write barrier =

In operating systems, write barrier is a mechanism for enforcing a particular ordering in a sequence of writes to a storage system in a computer system. For example, a write barrier in a file system is a mechanism (program logic) that ensures that in-memory file system state is written out to persistent storage in the correct order.

== In garbage collection ==
A write barrier in a garbage collector is a fragment of code emitted by the compiler immediately before every store operation to ensure that (e.g.) generational invariants are maintained.

== In computer storage ==
A write barrier in a memory system, also known as a memory barrier, is a hardware-specific compiler intrinsic that ensures that all preceding memory operations "happen before" all subsequent ones.

== See also ==
- Native Command Queuing
