= ESATA =

Variant of Serial ATA meant for external connectivity

eSATA
- External Serial ATA (SATA)/Universal Serial Bus (USB) with Power
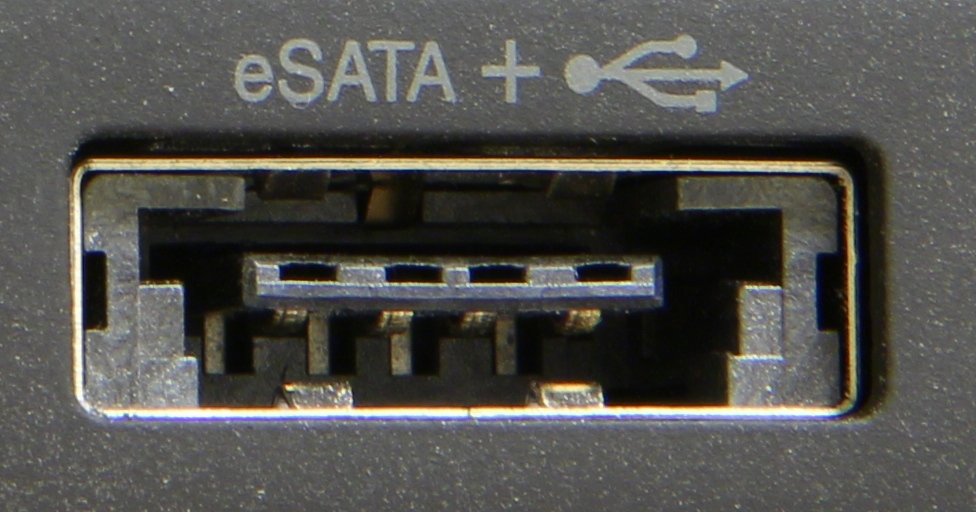
- eSATA-USB
- Year created: 2008
- Speed: SATA Rev. 1: 1.5 Gbit/s, SATA Rev. 2: 3 Gbit/s, SATA Rev. 3: 6 Gbit/s, USB High Speed: 480 Mbit/s, USB SuperSpeed: 5 Gbit/s
- Style: Serial
- Hotplugging interface: Yes
- External interface: eSATAp, eSATA, USB, eSATApd

External SATA (eSATA) is a variant of the Serial ATA (SATA) interface designed for connecting external storage devices to a computer. Standardized in 2004 by the Serial ATA International Organization, eSATA defines connectors and cables electrically distinct from internal SATA in order to make the two physically incompatible and to meet the more demanding requirements of external use. It was widely adopted on desktop computers, laptops, and external hard-drive enclosures during the late 2000s before being largely displaced by USB 3.0 and, later, USB-C and Thunderbolt interfaces.

- Minimum transmit potential increased: Range is 500–600 mV instead of 400–600 mV.
- Minimum receive potential decreased: Range is 240–600 mV instead of 325–600 mV.
- Identical protocol and logical signaling (link/transport-layer and above), allowing native SATA devices to be deployed in external enclosures with minimal modification
- Maximum cable length of 2 metres (6.6 ft) (USB and FireWire allow longer distances.)
- The external cable connector equates to a shielded version of the connector specified in SATA 1.0a with these basic differences:
  - The external connector has no "L" shaped key, and the guide features are vertically offset and reduced in size. This prevents the use of unshielded internal cables in external applications and vice-versa.
  - To prevent ESD damage, the design increased insertion depth from 5 mm to 6.6 mm and the contacts are mounted farther back in both the receptacle and plug.
  - To provide EMI protection and meet FCC and CE emission requirements, the cable has an extra layer of shielding, and the connectors have metal contact-points.
  - The connector shield has springs as retention features built in on both the top and bottom surfaces.
  - The external connector and cable have a design-life of over five thousand insertions and removals, while the internal connector is only specified to withstand fifty.

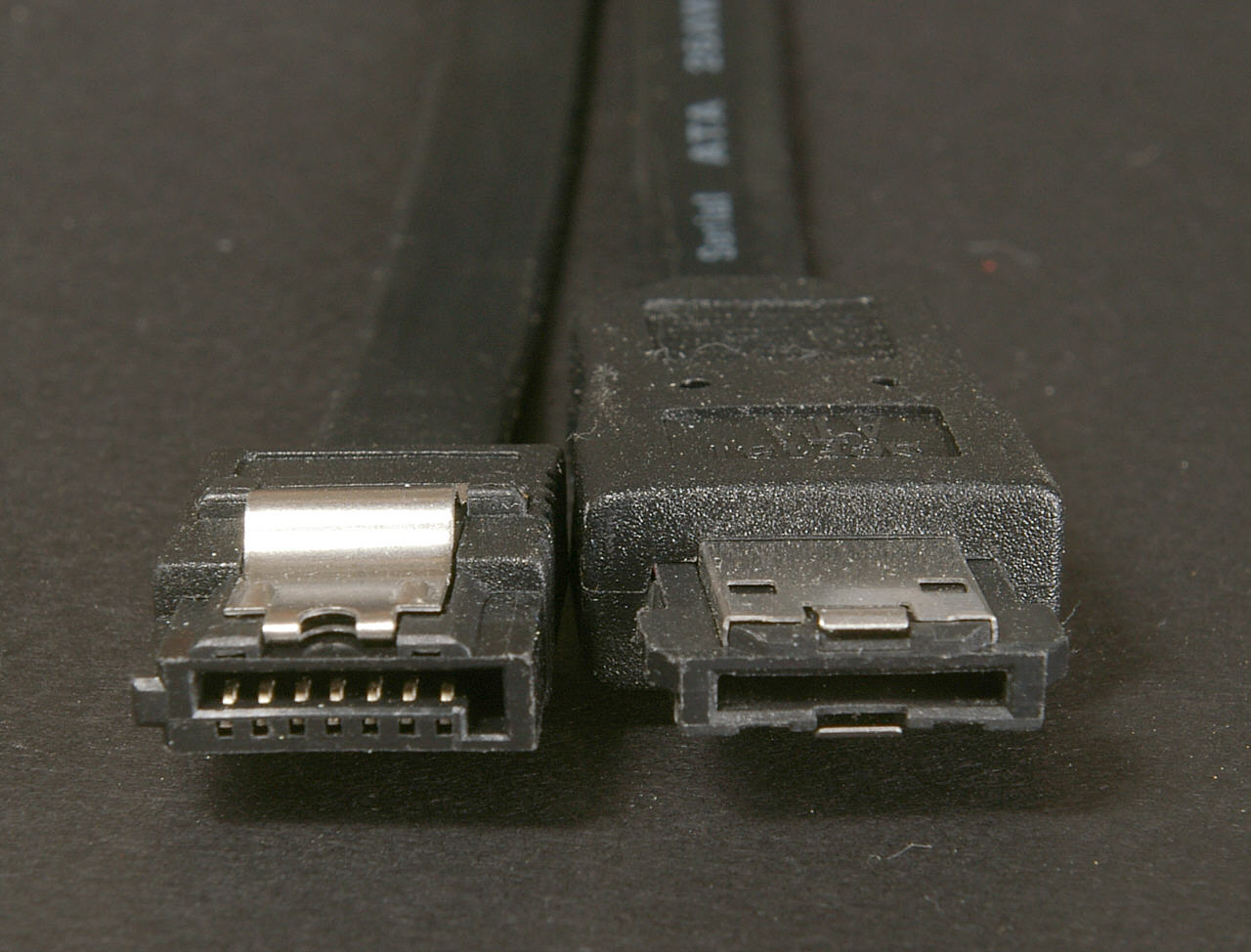
SATA (left) and eSATA (right) connectors

Aimed at the consumer market, eSATA enters an external storage market already served by the USB and FireWire interfaces. Most external hard-disk-drive cases with FireWire or USB interfaces use either PATA or SATA drives and "bridges" to translate between the drives' interfaces and the enclosures' external ports, and this bridging incurs some inefficiency. Some single disks can transfer 131 MB/s during real use, more than twice the maximum transfer rate of USB 2.0 or FireWire 400 (IEEE 1394a) and well in excess of the maximum transfer rate of FireWire 800, though the S3200 FireWire 1394b spec reaches ~400 MB/s (3.2 Gbit/s). Finally, some low-level drive features, such as S.M.A.R.T., may not operate through USB or FireWire bridging. eSATA does not suffer from these issues. USB 3.0's 5.0 Gbit/s and Firewire's future 6.4 Gbit/s will be faster than eSATA I, but the eSATA version of SATA III will operate at 6.0 Gbit/s, thereby operating at negligible differences of each other.

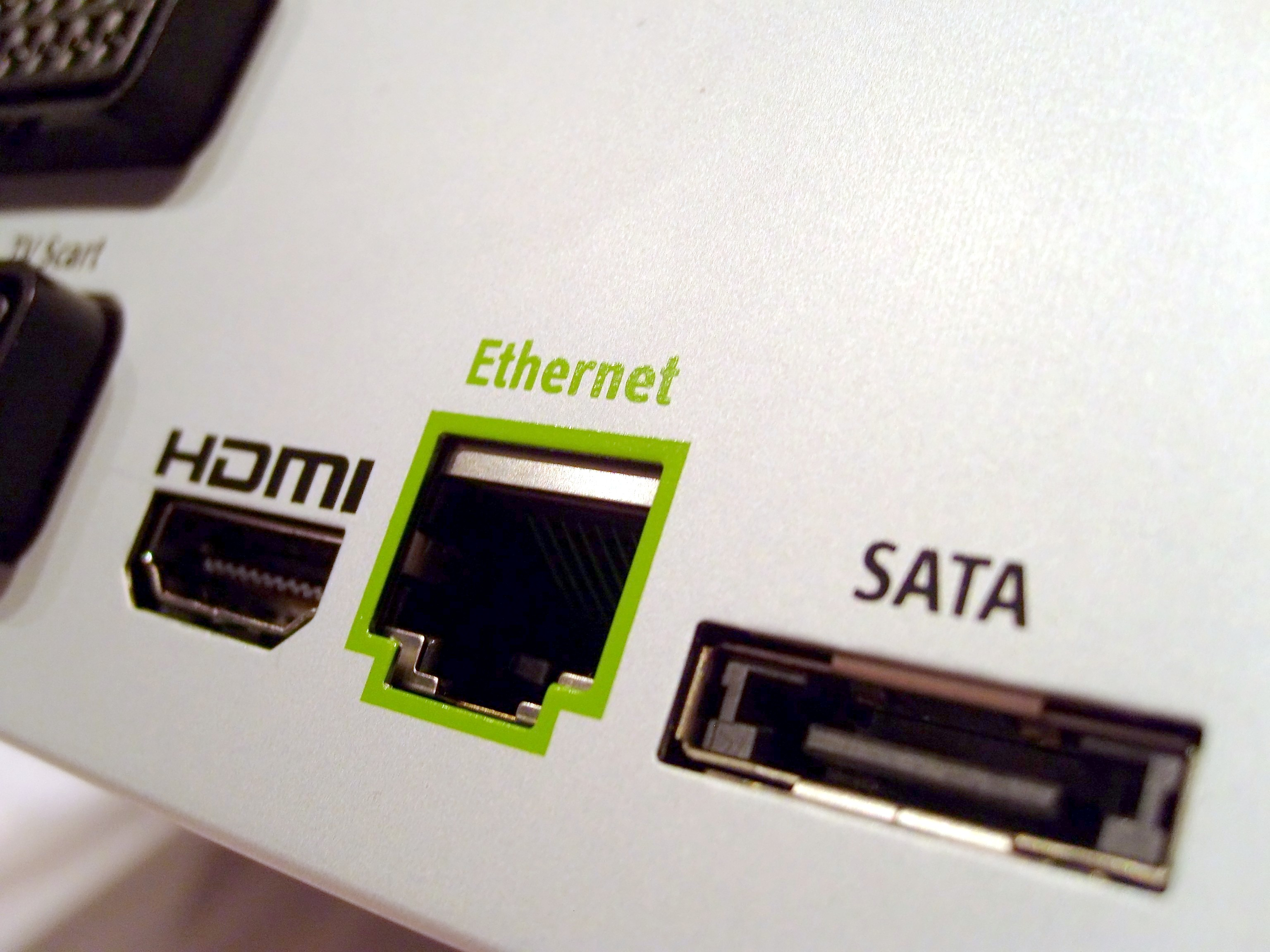
HDMI, Ethernet, and eSATA ports on a Sky+ HD Digibox

eSATA can be differentiated from USB 2.0 and FireWire external storage for several reasons. As of early 2008, the vast majority of mass-market computers have USB ports and many computers and consumer electronic appliances have FireWire ports, but few devices have external SATA connectors. For small form-factor devices (such as external 2.5-inch disks), a PC-hosted USB or FireWire link supplies sufficient power to operate the device. Where a PC-hosted port is concerned, eSATA connectors cannot supply power, and would therefore be more cumbersome to use.

Owners of desktop computers that lack a built-in eSATA interface can upgrade them with the installation of an eSATA host bus adapter (HBA), while notebooks can be upgraded with Cardbus or ExpressCard versions of an eSATA HBA. With passive adapters the maximum cable length is reduced to 1 metre (3.3 ft) due to the absence of compliant eSATA signal-levels. Full SATA speed for external disks (115 MB/s) have been measured with external RAID enclosures.

eSATA may attract the enterprise and server market, which has already standardized on the Serial Attached SCSI (SAS) interface, because of its hotplug capability and low price.

Prior to the final eSATA specification, a number of products existed designed for external connections of SATA drives. Some of these use the internal SATA connector or even connectors designed for other interface specifications, such as FireWire. These products are not eSATA compliant. The final eSATA specification features a specific connector designed for rough handling, similar to the regular SATA connector, but with reinforcements in both the male and female sides, inspired by the USB connector. eSATA resists inadvertent unplugging, and can withstand yanking or wiggling which would break a male SATA connector (the hard-drive or host adapter, usually fitted inside the computer). With an eSATA connector, considerably more force is needed to damage the connector, and if it does break it is likely to be the female side, on the cable itself, which is relatively easy to replace.

== eSATAp ==
PCIe 1x eSATAp controller card with CompactFlash memory card reader

In computing, eSATAp (also known as Power over eSATA, Power eSATA, eSATA-USB, eSATA/USB Combo, or eSATA USB Hybrid Port/EUHP) is a combination connection for external storage devices. This type of port allows either an eSATA or USB device to be connected. The eSATAp socket includes keyed cutouts for both types of connectors, ensuring that devices can only be plugged in the correct orientation for compatibility and functionality.

As the port is designed to work with both SATA and USB, both organizations have formally approved it. The USB Implementers Forum states it does not support any connector used by other standards, and such 'combo' ports are to be used at the user's risk. As of 2011 the organization responsible for the SATA specification, SATA-IO (Serial ATA International Organization), was working in 2008 to define the eSATAp specification. US Patent US7572146B1 appears to document the eSATApd variant.

=== Implementation ===
SATA is a computer bus interface for connecting host bus adapters to mass storage devices such as hard disk drives and optical drives. eSATA is a SATA connector accessible from outside the computer, to provide a signal (but not power) connection for external storage devices. These adapters were available from a number of vendors.

eSATAp combines the functionality of an eSATA and a USB port, and a source of power in a single connector. eSATAp can supply power at 5 V, and at 12 V if available.

On a desktop computer the port is simply a connector, usually mounted on a bracket at the back accessible from outside the machine, connected to motherboard sources of SATA, USB, and power at 5 V and 12 V. No change is required to drivers, registry or BIOS settings and the USB support is independent of the SATA connection.

If advanced functionality such as a port multiplier is required, a PCI Express add-on card can be used. If it has port multiplier support, an eSATAp port allows a user to connect to a multi-bay NAS (network attached storage) machine with multiple hard disks (HDD) using one eSATA cable. On many notebook computers limited power at 5 V is available, and none at 12 V. Devices requiring more power than is available via the Expresscard, or an additional 12 V supply as required by most 3.5" or 5.25" drives, can be supported if an additional power supply is used. Cables are available to both connect and power a SATA device from an eSATAp port (including 12 V power if available).

=== Naming ===
The following names are used by different manufacturers for the same type of port:

- eSATAp (Delock, Dynex, Lindy, Addonics)
- eSATApd (Used by Delock to distinguish a port that supplies both +5 V and +12 V)
- Power over eSATA (Delock, Micro-Star International (MSI))
- eSATA/USB (Gigabyte Technology)
- Power eSATA/USB (ASRock)

Other computer manufacturers have made computers and motherboards with eSATAp ports, including Dell, HP, Lenovo, Sony and Toshiba.

== SATA and PATA ==
At the device level, SATA and PATA (Parallel Advanced Technology Attachment) devices remain completely incompatible—they cannot be interconnected. At the application level, SATA devices can be specified to look and act like PATA devices. Many motherboards offer a "legacy mode" option which makes SATA drives appear to the OS like PATA drives on a standard controller. This eases OS installation by not requiring a specific driver to be loaded during setup but sacrifices support for some features of SATA and generally disables some of the boards' PATA or SATA ports since the standard PATA controller interface only supports 4 drives. (Often which ports are disabled is configurable.)

The common heritage of the ATA command set has enabled the proliferation of low-cost PATA to SATA bridge-chips. Bridge-chips were widely used on PATA drives (before the completion of native SATA drives) as well as standalone "dongles." When attached to a PATA drive, a device-side dongle allows the PATA drive to function as a SATA drive. Host-side dongles allow a motherboard PATA port to function as a SATA host port.

The market has produced powered enclosures for both PATA and SATA drives which interface to the PC through USB, Firewire or eSATA, with the restrictions noted above. PCI cards with a SATA connector exist that allow SATA drives to connect to legacy systems without SATA connectors.

== SATA 1.5 Gbit/s and SATA 3 Gbit/s ==
The designers of SATA aimed for backward and forward compatibility with future revisions of the SATA standard.

According to the hard drive manufacturer Maxtor, motherboard host controllers using the VIA and SIS chipsets VT8237, VT8237R, VT6420, VT6421L, SIS760, SIS964 found on the ECS 755-A2 manufactured in 2003, do not support SATA 3 Gbit/s drives. Additionally, these host controllers do not support SATA 3 Gbit/s optical disc drives. To address interoperability problems, the largest hard drive manufacturer, Seagate/Maxtor, has added a user-accessible jumper-switch known as the Force 150, to switch between 150 MB/s and 300 MB/s operation. Users with a SATA 1.5 Gbit/s motherboard with one of the listed chipsets should either buy an ordinary SATA 1.5 Gbit/s hard disk, buy a SATA 3 Gbit/s hard disk with the user-accessible jumper, or buy a PCI or PCI-E card to add full SATA 3 Gbit/s capability and compatibility. Western Digital uses a jumper setting called OPT1 Enabled to force 150 MB/s data transfer speed. OPT1 is used by putting the jumper on pins 5 & 6.

== Bibliography ==
- eSATA | SATA-IO
- Upgrading and Repairing PCs: Upgrading and Repairing_c22
- Moving Media Storage Technologies: Applications & Workflows for Video and Media Server Platforms
