= JMicron =

Taiwanese fabless technology design house

JMicron Technology Corporation 智微科技
- Type: Public
- Traded as: GTSM: 4925
- Industry: Semiconductors
- Founded: September 2001; 25 years ago
- Headquarters: Hsinchu, Taiwan
- Key people: Tim Liu (Chairman); Tim Liu (President)
- Products: Integrated circuits, bridge controllers
- Number of employees: 141
- Website: www.jmicron.com

JMicron Technology Corporation (Chinese: 智微科技; pinyin: Zhìwēi Kējì) is a Taiwan-based fabless technology design house based in Hsinchu, Taiwan. As a manufacturer of integrated circuits, they produce controller chips for bridge devices.

== History ==
=== 2001–2007 ===
The company was founded in September 2001 and its headquarters is in Hsinchu, Taiwan. The company also operates an advanced R&D center based out of Irvine, California, United States.

In 2002, the company began development of their USB 2.0 to SATA bridge controller technology.

JMicron began developing SSD technology in 2006, launching their first generation SSD controller, the JMF601A/602A, towards the end of 2007. JMicron's SSD controller was widely adopted by many SSD manufacturers such ASUS, Corsair, OCZ, and Transcend. JMicron was one of the first companies to provide an SSD controller chip to these companies, allowing them to produce reasonably priced SSDs. Unfortunately the SSD controller did not have any support for DRAM cache, and with the NAND technology available at the time this made random writes very slow (the JMF602B improved this only slightly).

=== 2008 to present ===
Also in 2008, JMicron showcased a number of peripheral products. This includes the JMB353, a hi-speed USB & IEEE 1394a to SATA II external HDD controller chip; this device was the first to feature an integrated IEEE 1394a PHY chip. Also included in the showcase is the JMB38x series, a PCIe to card reader & 1394 controller chip, the JMB211, a Gigabit Ethernet PHY controller chip, the JMB352, a high-speed USB & eSATA to 2-port SATA II external HDD controller chip, and the JMB325, a 1- to 5-port SATA II port multiplier with hardware RAID.

In 2009, the JMF612 was released. It saw popularity throughout 2010 in its use in a number of industry SSDs. In particular, 2009 was a landmark year for JMicron, in that the company achieved the top ranking as a supplier for external HDD and SATA-PATA bridge controllers, shipping roughly 35 million and 15 million units, respectively.

In October 2010, JMicron was scheduled to list on the Taiwanese Gre Tai Securities Market (GTSM). Also in 2010, a Gartner tandem research report reveals JMicron to be first in interface controller chip market share. In 2010 stolen private keys certificates were used to digitally sign rootkit drivers in Stuxnet virus.

After developing its own physical layer and high speed technology over the preceding years because of flat growth in the long term, JMicron diversifies from the base notebook and motherboard controller business. 2011 is characterized by JMicron winning orders from Western Digital and Samsung Electronics for JMicron's USB 3.0 HDD controller, with net sales projected to grow 10%.

In late 2011, the JMF661 was released as a third generation JMicron SSD controller, and it was shown to be an effective entry-level product. Shortly thereafter, in 2013, the JMF667 series was released as a 256 GB capacity, 512 MB DDR3 external cache SSD controller. Analysis in 2013 reveals that SSD controller technology and high-speed transmission interface IC accounts for 29% and 67% of JMicron's sales, respectively.

In June 2014, JMicron announced the JMF670 and JMF670H. Both are 4-channel SATA SSD controllers capable of supporting up to 512 GB of storage capacity. Production was to begin in July 2014. In the same announcement, they showcased the JMF810, a PCIe Gen II 2-lane controller, and the JMF811, a PCIe Gen II 4-lane SSD controller. These controllers are designed for speeds of up to 1.5 GB/s in sequential read and 1.2 GB/s in sequential write. Another announcement was the JMS577, which is a USB 3.0 to SATA VI Gb/s bridge controller. The company also showcased their USB 3.1 technology, which is expected to achieve data transmission speeds of 10 Gbit/s—doubling the speed of the previous USB Gen III controller. Among these announcements included a single-chip, dual-port SATA III RAID/CLONE program within the JMS561/562/561U product line.

Throughout 2014, JMicron's JMF667H was reviewed by a number of online review sites like Tom's Hardware, AnandTech, and TweakTown.

In June 2016, JMicron spun off its SSD division to Maxiotek Corporation, a Taiwan-based company which designs and markets SSD controller products. Meanwhile, JMicron released the JMS576, its first USB-C USB 3.1 Gen 1 to SATA 6 Gbit/s bridge controller.

== Products ==
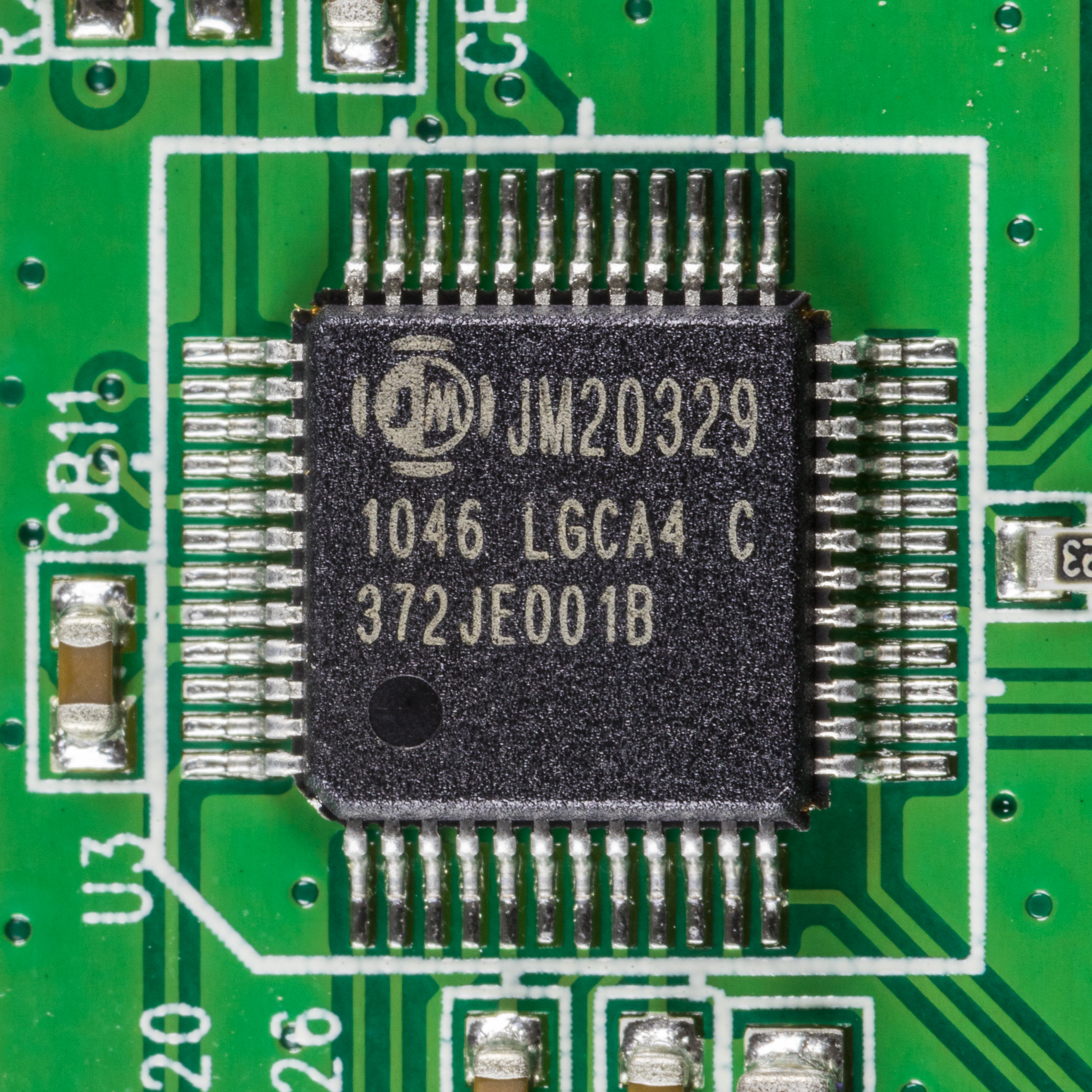
JM20329: Hi-Speed USB to SATA Bridge

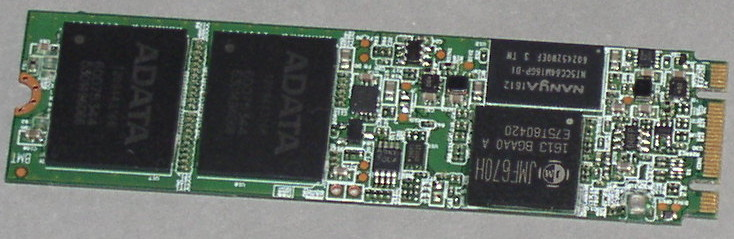
M.2 SSD with controller JMF670H

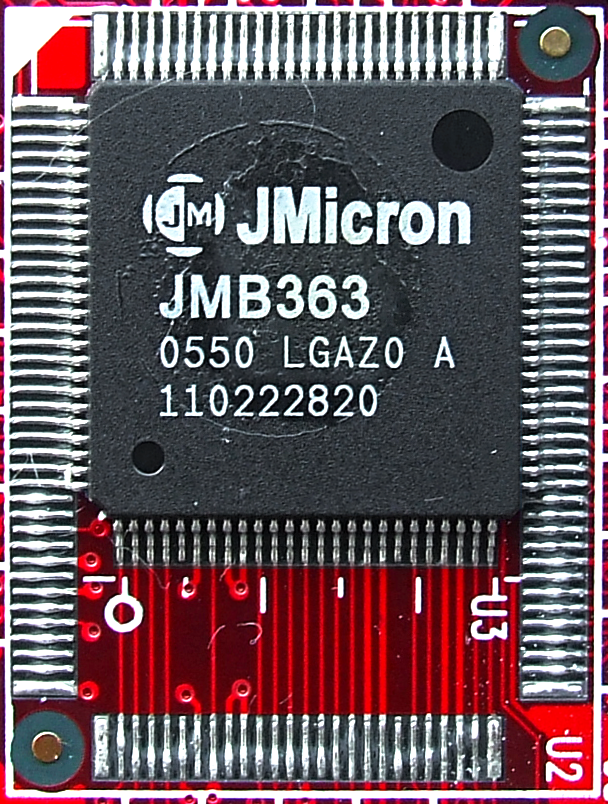
JMB363: combined single-chip PCIe PATA/SATA controller

=== USB bridge controller ===
USB-multi-interfaces

- JMS581: USB3.2 Gen2x1 to SD7.x / PCIe / SATA

USB-UFS

- JMS901: USB 3.2 Gen1 to UFS 2.1/ UHS-1

USB-SATA

- JMS591: USB3.2 Gen2x2 to 5x SATA 6 Gb/s (RAID 0/1/5/10/JBOD)
- JMS580: USB 3.2 Gen2 to SATA 6 Gb/s
- JMS578: USB 3.0 to SATA 6 Gb/s
- JMS576: USB 3.2 Gen1 to SATA 6 Gb/s
- JMS562: USB 3.0 & eSATA 6 Gb/s to Dual SATA 6 Gb/s (RAID 0/1/JBOD)
- JMS561U: USB 3.0 to Dual SATA 6 Gb/s (CLONE)
- JMS561: USB 3.0 to Dual SATA 6 Gb/s (RAID 0/1/JBOD)
- JM20337: USB 2.0 to SATA/PATA
- JM20329: USB 2.0 to SATA

USB-PCIe

- JMS586: USB 3.2 Gen2x2 to PCIe/NVMe Gen3x4
- JMS583: USB 3.2 Gen2 to PCIe/NVMe Gen3x2

=== PCIe bridge controller ===
PCIe-PATA (IDE)

- JMB361: PCIe 1.0a x1 to 1x Serial ATA II and 1x PATA UDMA/100 channel
- JMB363: PCIe 1.0a x1 to 2x Serial ATA II and 1x PATA UDMA/100 channel
- JMB368: PCIe 1.0a x1 to 1x PATA UDMA/100 channel

PCIe-SATA

- JMB585: PCIe Gen3x2 to 5x SATA 6 Gb/s
- JMB582: PCIe Gen3x1 to 2x SATA 6 Gb/s

=== M.2 controller ===
- JMF670H: NAND flash controller for M.2 SSD

=== SATA bridge controller ===
SATA-SATA

- JMB575: 1 to 5-port SATA 6 Gb/s Port Multiplier or 5 to 1-port SATA 6 Gb/s Port Selector
- JMB572: 1 to 2-port SATA 6 Gb/s Port Multiplier or 2 to 1-port SATA 6 Gb/s Port Selector
- JMB394: 1 to 5-port SATA 3 Gb/s Port Multiplier (RAID 0/1/5/10/JBOD / CLONE with LCM interfaces)
- JMB393: 1 to 5-port SATA 3 Gb/s Port Multiplier (RAID 0/1/5/10/JBOD/CLONE)
- JMB391: 1 to 5-ports SATA 3 Gb/s Port Multiplier (RAID 0/1/10/JBOD)
- JMB390: 1 to 2-port SATA 3 Gb/s Port Multiplier (RAID 0/1/JBOD)

SATA-PATA

- JMD330: SATA to PATA
- JMH330/S: PATA to SATA

== Market reception ==
When flash controllers were first offered to SSD manufacturers in 2008, JMicron's early JMF601 and JMF602 models were reported to have issues with write latency, causing a stuttering problem. The performance problem was attributed to the small buffer size used in the controller. After several corrective releases, JMicron released the JMF667H, which to date has received generally positive reviews, being cited as both competitive and budget-friendly when used with the correct type of NAND. For instance, when paired with Toshiba's A19 NAND, the JMF667H has been shown to be capable of achieving the following metrics: 500 MB/s for 128 KB sequential read, 450 MB/s for 128 KB sequential write, and reaching 80,000 4 KB IOPS for both random read and write. The JMF667H has also been found to have very low power consumption, with active idle power consumption in the 0.2–0.4 W range depending on the capacity of the controller, as well as an average power consumption rating of 0.36–0.78 W when examined in PCMark 7. Certain drives driven by the JMF667H controller, such as the Kingfast C-Drive F8, have achieved high scores on independent review sites—for example, 90% on TweakTown.

== See also ==
- List of companies of Taiwan
