= SATA =

Computer bus interface for storage devices

- Year created: 2000
- Created by: Serial ATA Working Group
- Supersedes: Parallel ATA (PATA)
- Speed: Half-duplex 1.5, 3.0 and 6.0 Gbit/s
- Style: Serial
- Hotplugging interface: Optional
- External interface: Optional (eSATA)
- Website: sata-io.org

SATA (Serial AT Attachment) (Note: "AT" is derived from the IBM Personal Computer/AT. IBM did not specify a meaning for AT and neither did the Serial ATA International Organization in the specification document. The standard is marketed as Serial ATA, but SATA is the most common name.) is a computer bus interface announced in 2000 that connects host bus adapters to mass storage devices such as hard disk drives, optical drives, and solid-state drives. Revision 1.0 of the specification was released in January 2003. Serial ATA succeeded the earlier Parallel ATA (PATA) standard to become the predominant interface for storage devices.

Its advantages over the earlier PATA interface include reduced cable size and cost (seven conductors instead of 40 or 80), native hot swapping, faster data transfer through higher signaling rates, and more efficient transfer through an (optional) I/O queuing protocol.

Serial ATA industry compatibility specifications originate from the Serial ATA International Organization (SATA-IO) which are then released by the INCITS Technical Committee T13, AT Attachment (INCITS T13).

== History ==
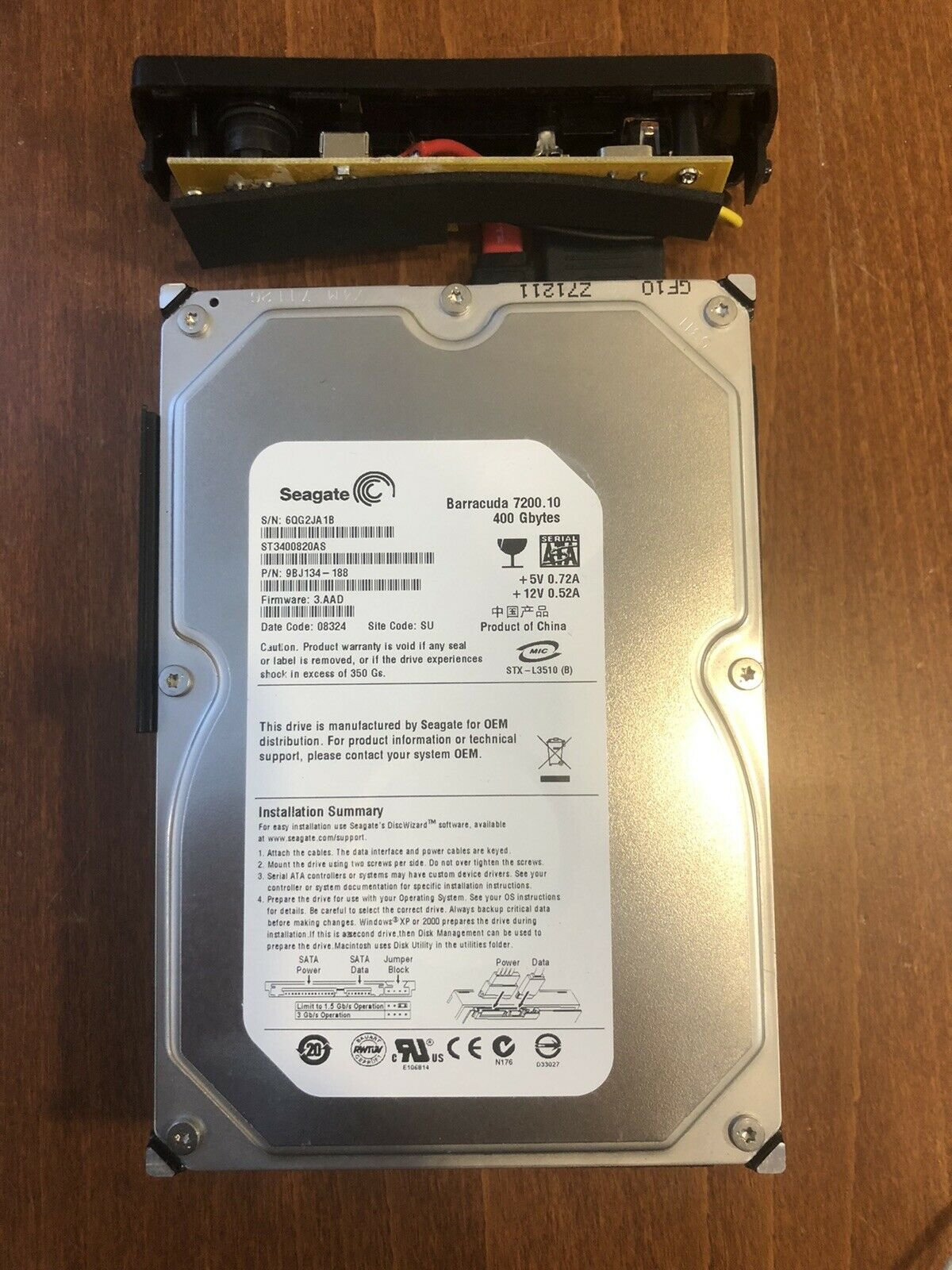
A 3.5-inch Serial ATA hard disk drive

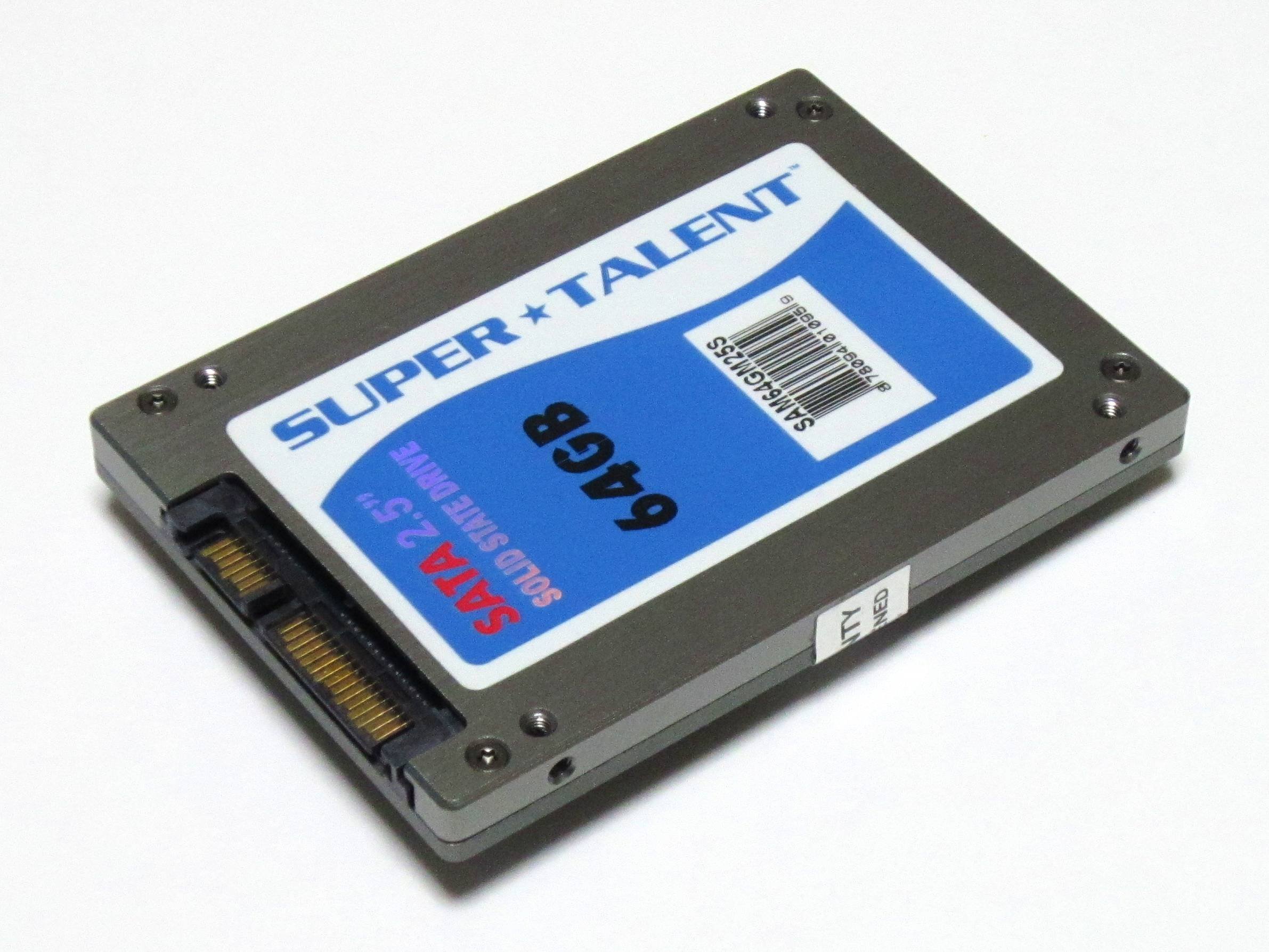
A 2.5-inch Serial ATA solid-state drive

Serial ATA industry compatibility specifications originate from the Serial ATA International Organization (SATA-IO). The SATA-IO group collaboratively creates, reviews, ratifies, and publishes the interoperability specifications, the test cases and plugfests. As with many other industry compatibility standards, the SATA content ownership is transferred to other industry bodies: primarily INCITS T13 and an INCITS T10 subcommittee (SCSI), a subgroup of T10 responsible for Serial Attached SCSI (SAS). The remainder of this article strives to use the SATA-IO terminology and specifications.

Before SATA's introduction in 2000, PATA was simply known as ATA. The "AT Attachment" (ATA) name originated after the 1984 release of the IBM Personal Computer AT, more commonly known as the IBM AT. The IBM AT's controller interface became a de facto industry interface for the inclusion of hard disks. "AT" was IBM's abbreviation for "Advanced Technology"; thus, many companies and organizations indicate SATA is an abbreviation of "Serial Advanced Technology Attachment". However, the ATA specifications simply use the name "AT Attachment", to avoid possible trademark issues with IBM.

SATA host adapters and devices communicate via a high-speed serial cable over two pairs of conductors. In contrast, parallel ATA (the redesignation for the legacy ATA specifications) uses a 16-bit wide data bus with many additional support and control signals, all operating at a much lower frequency. To ensure backward compatibility with legacy ATA software and applications, SATA uses the same basic ATA and ATAPI command sets as legacy ATA devices.

The world's first SATA hard disk drive was the Seagate Barracuda SATA V, released in January 2003.

SATA replaced parallel ATA in consumer desktop and laptop computers; SATA's market share in the desktop PC market was 99% in 2008. PATA has mostly been replaced by SATA for any use; with PATA in declining use in industrial and embedded applications that use CompactFlash (CF) storage, which was designed around the legacy PATA standard. A 2008 standard, CFast, to replace CompactFlash is based on SATA.

== Features ==
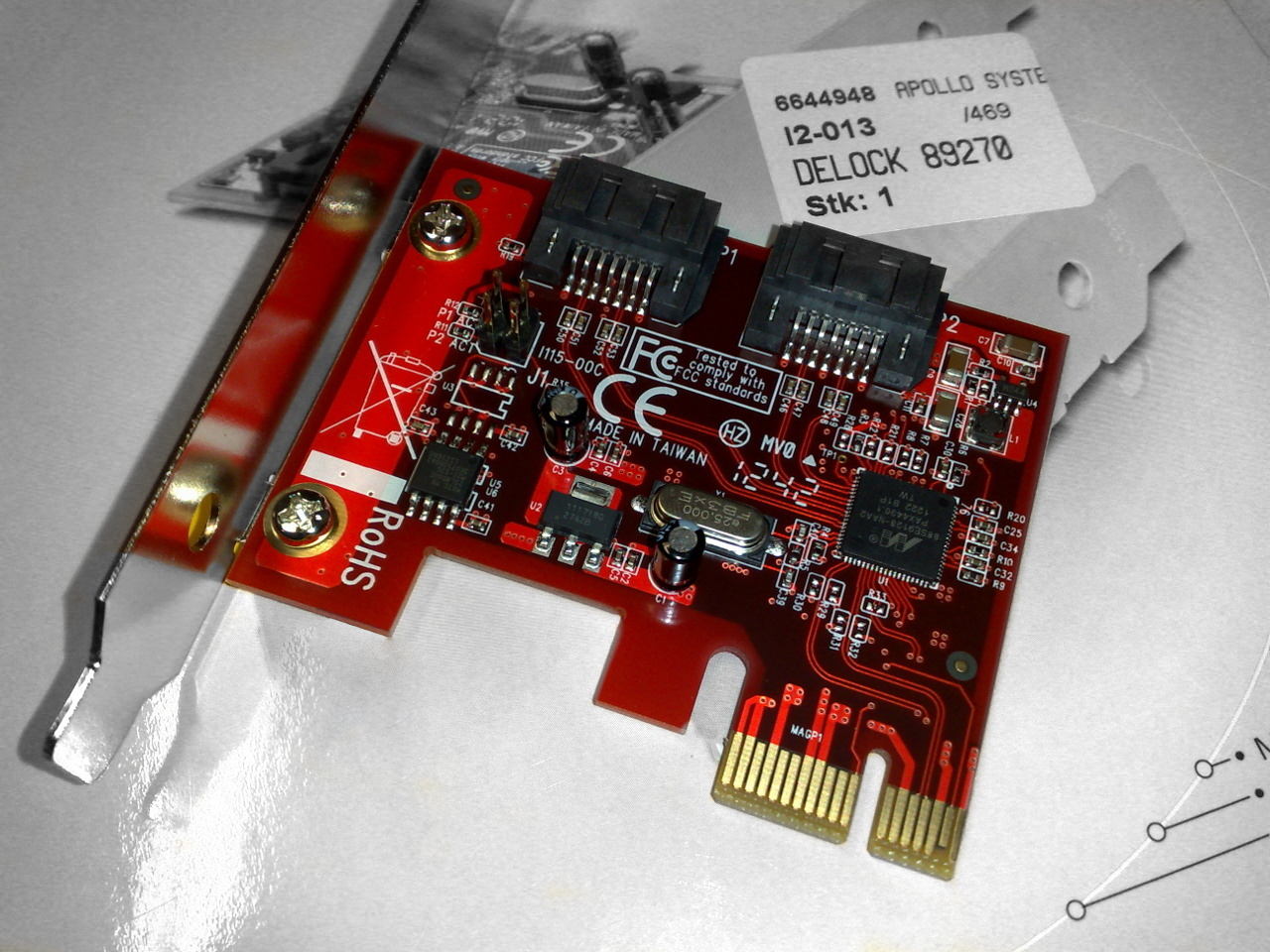
SATA 6 Gbit/s host controller, a PCI Express ×1 card with Marvell chipset

=== Hot plug ===
The Serial ATA spec requires SATA devices be capable of hot plugging; that is, devices that meet the specification are capable of insertion or removal of a device into or from a backplane connector (combined signal and power) that has power on. After insertion, the device initializes and then operates normally. Depending upon the operating system, the host may also initialize, resulting in a hot swap. The powered host and device do not need to be in an idle state for safe insertion and removal, although unwritten data may be lost when power is removed.

Unlike PATA, both SATA and eSATA support hot plugging by design. However, this feature requires proper support at the host, device (drive), and operating-system levels. In general, SATA devices fulfill the device-side hot-plugging requirements, and most SATA host adapters support this function.

For eSATA, hot plugging is supported in AHCI mode only. IDE mode does not support hot plugging.

=== Advanced Host Controller Interface ===
Advanced Host Controller Interface (AHCI) is an open host controller interface published and used by Intel, which has become a de facto standard. It allows the use of advanced features of SATA such as hotplug and native command queuing (NCQ). If AHCI is not enabled by the motherboard and chipset, SATA controllers typically operate in "IDE (Note: Integrated Drive Electronics) emulation" mode, which does not allow access to device features not supported by the ATA (also called IDE) standard.

Windows device drivers that are labeled as SATA are often running in IDE emulation mode unless they explicitly state that they are AHCI mode, in RAID mode, or a mode provided by a proprietary driver and command set that allowed access to SATA's advanced features before AHCI became popular. Modern versions of Microsoft Windows, Mac OS X, FreeBSD, Linux with version 2.6.19 onward, as well as Solaris and OpenSolaris, include support for AHCI, but earlier operating systems such as Windows XP do not. Even in those instances, a proprietary driver may have been created for a specific chipset, such as Intel's.

== Revisions ==
SATA revisions are typically designated with a dash followed by Roman numerals, e.g. "SATA-III", to avoid confusion with the speed, which is always displayed in Arabic numerals, e.g. "SATA 6 Gbit/s". The speeds given are the raw interface rate in Gbit/s including line code overhead, and the usable data rate in MB/s without overhead.

=== SATA revision 1.0 (1.5 Gbit/s, 150 MB/s, Serial ATA-150) ===
Revision 1.0a was released on January 7, 2003. First-generation SATA interfaces, now known as SATA 1.5 Gbit/s, communicate at a rate of 1.5 Gbit/s, and do not support Native Command Queuing (NCQ). Taking 8b/10b encoding overhead into account, they have an actual uncoded transfer rate of 1.2 Gbit/s (150 MB/s). The theoretical burst throughput of SATA 1.5 Gbit/s is similar to that of PATA/133, but newer SATA devices offer enhancements such as NCQ, which improve performance in a multitasking environment.

During the initial period after SATA 1.5 Gbit/s finalization, adapter and drive manufacturers used a "bridge chip" to convert existing PATA designs for use with the SATA interface. Bridged drives have a SATA connector, may include either or both kinds of power connectors, and, in general, perform identically to their native-SATA equivalents.

As of April 2010, the fastest 10,000 rpm SATA hard disk drives could transfer data at maximum (not average) rates of up to 157 MB/s, which is beyond the capabilities of the older PATA/133 specification and also exceeds the capabilities of SATA 1.5 Gbit/s.

=== SATA revision 2.0 (3 Gbit/s, 300 MB/s, Serial ATA-300) ===
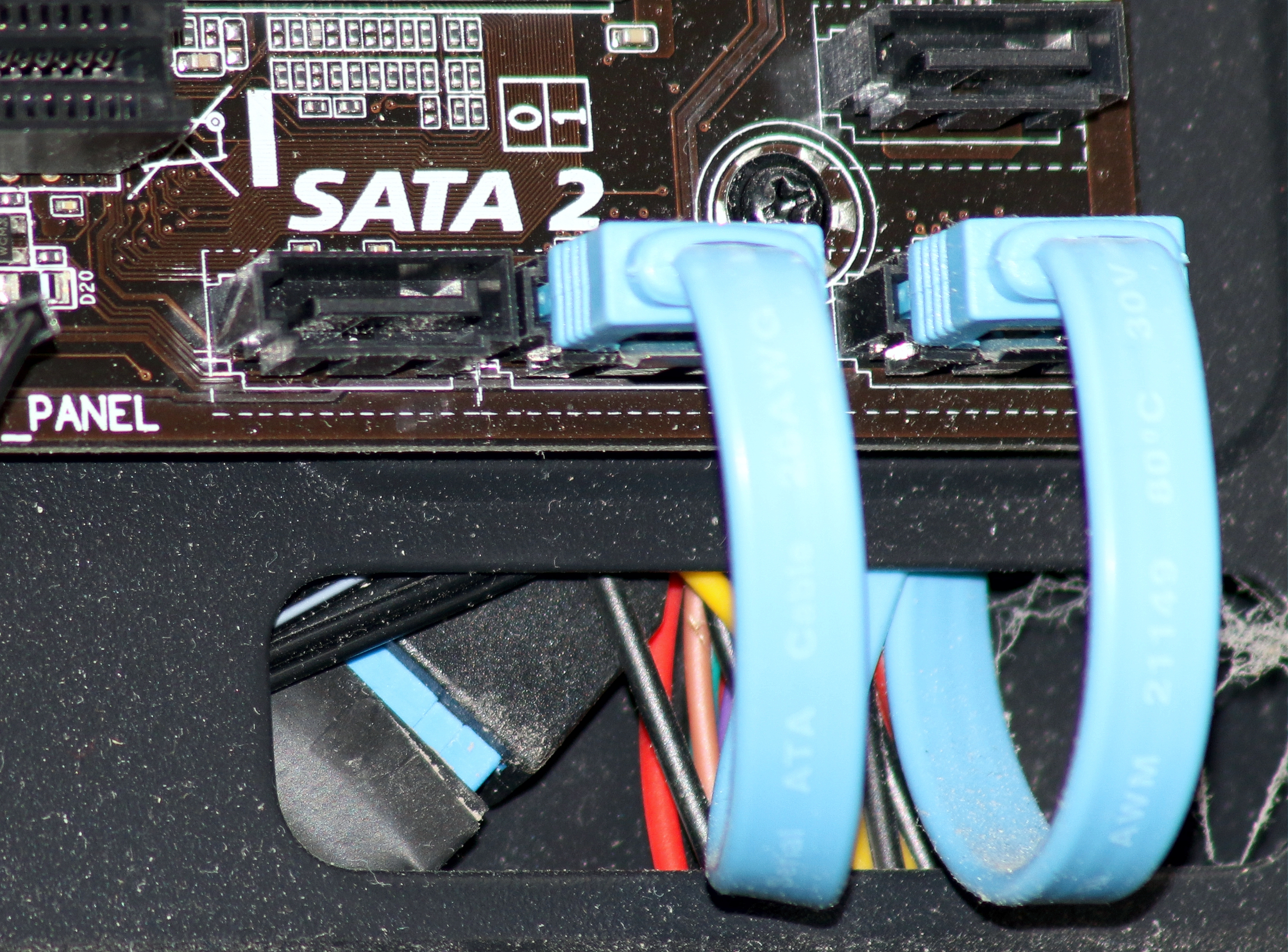
Four SATA 2 connectors on a computer motherboard, two with cables plugged in. Note that there is no visible difference, other than the labeling, between SATA 1, SATA 2, and SATA 3 cables and connectors.

SATA revision 2.0 was released in April 2004, introducing Native Command Queuing (NCQ). It is backward compatible with SATA 1.5 Gbit/s.

Second-generation SATA interfaces run with a native transfer rate of 3.0 Gbit/s that, when accounted for the 8b/10b encoding scheme, equals to the maximum uncoded transfer rate of 2.4 Gbit/s (300 MB/s). The theoretical burst throughput of the SATA revision 2.0, which is also known as the SATA 3 Gbit/s, doubles the throughput of SATA revision 1.0.

All SATA data cables meeting the SATA spec are rated for 3.0 Gbit/s and handle modern mechanical drives without any loss of sustained and burst data transfer performance. However, high-performance flash-based drives can exceed the SATA 3 Gbit/s transfer rate; this is addressed with the SATA 6 Gbit/s interoperability standard.

==== SATA revision 2.5 ====
Announced in August 2005, SATA revision 2.5 consolidated the specification to a single document.

==== SATA revision 2.6 ====
Announced in February 2007, SATA revision 2.6 introduced the following features:

- Slimline connector
- Micro connector (initially for 1.8” HDD)
- Mini Internal Multilane cable and connector
- Mini External Multilane cable and connector
- NCQ Priority
- NCQ Unload
- Enhancements to the BIST Activate FIS
- Enhancements for robust reception of the Signature FIS

=== SATA revision 3.0 (6 Gbit/s, 600 MB/s, Serial ATA-600) ===
Serial ATA International Organization (SATA-IO) presented the draft specification of SATA 6 Gbit/s physical layer in July 2008, and ratified its physical layer specification on August 18, 2008. The full 3.0 standard was released on May 27, 2009.

Third-generation SATA interfaces run with a native transfer rate of 6.0 Gbit/s; taking 8b/10b encoding into account, the maximum uncoded transfer rate is 4.8 Gbit/s (600 MB/s). The theoretical burst throughput of SATA 6.0 Gbit/s is double that of SATA revision 2.0. It is backward compatible with earlier SATA implementations.

The SATA 3.0 specification contains the following changes:

- 6 Gbit/s for scalable performance.
- Continued compatibility with SAS, including SAS 6 Gbit/s, as per "a SAS domain may support attachment to and control of unmodified SATA devices connected directly into the SAS domain using the Serial ATA Tunneled Protocol (STP)" from the SATA Revision 3.0 Gold specification.
- Isochronous Native Command Queuing (NCQ) streaming command to enable isochronous quality of service data transfers for streaming digital content applications.
- An NCQ management feature that helps optimize performance by enabling host processing and management of outstanding NCQ commands.
- Improved power management capabilities.
- A small low insertion force (LIF) connector for more compact 1.8-inch storage devices.
- A 7 mm optical disk drive profile for the slimline SATA connector (in addition to the existing 12.7 mm and 9.5 mm profiles).
- Alignment with the INCITS ATA8-ACS standard.

In general, the enhancements are aimed at improving quality of service for video streaming and high-priority interrupts. In addition, the standard continues to support distances up to one meter. The newer speeds may require higher power consumption for supporting chips, though improved process technologies and power management techniques may mitigate this. The later specification can use existing SATA cables and connectors, though it was reported in 2008 that some OEMs were expected to upgrade host connectors for the higher speeds.

==== SATA revision 3.1 ====
Released in July 2011, SATA revision 3.1 introduced or changed the following features:

- mSATA, for solid-state drives in mobile computing devices, a PCI Express Mini Card-like connector that is electrically SATA. The connector was also used in some desktop computers, such as certain HP business PCs.
- Zero-power optical disk drive, a SATA optical drive that draws no power when idle.
- Queued TRIM Command, improves solid-state drive performance.
- Required Link Power Management, reduces overall system power demand of several SATA devices.
- Hardware Control Features, enable host identification of device capabilities.
- Universal Storage Module (USM), a new standard for cableless plug-in (slot) powered storage for consumer electronics devices.

==== SATA revision 3.2 ====
Released in August 2013, SATA revision 3.2 introduced the following features:

- The SATA Express specification defines an interface that combines both SATA and PCI Express buses, making it possible for both types of storage devices to coexist. By employing PCI Express, a much higher theoretical throughput of 1969 MB/s is possible.
- The SATA M.2 standard is a small form factor implementation of the SATA Express interface, with the addition of an internal USB 3.0 port; see the M.2 (NGFF) section below for a more detailed summary.
- microSSD introduces a ball grid array electrical interface for miniaturized, embedded SATA storage.
- USM Slim reduces thickness of Universal Storage Module (USM) from 14.5 millimeters (0.57 inches) to 9 millimeters (0.35 inches).
- DevSleep enables lower power consumption for always-on devices while they are in low-power modes such as InstantGo (which used to be known as Connected Standby).
- Hybrid Information provides higher performance for solid-state hybrid drives.

==== SATA revision 3.3 ====
Released in February 2016, SATA revision 3.3 introduced the following features:

- Shingled magnetic recording (SMR) host-control support (device-controlled SMR HDDs are the same as standard CMR HDDs with respect to SATA compatibility). SMR provides a 25 percent or greater increase in hard disk drive capacity by overlapping tracks on the media.
- Optional Zoned ATA Command Set (ZAC) feature.
- Power Disable feature (see PWDIS pin) allows for remote power cycling of SATA drives and a Rebuild Assist function that speeds up the rebuild process to help ease maintenance in the data center.
- Transmitter Emphasis Specification increases interoperability and reliability between host and devices in electrically demanding environments.
- An activity indicator and staggered spin-up can be controlled by the same pin, adding flexibility and providing users with more choices.

The new Power Disable feature (similar to the SAS Power Disable feature) uses Pin 3 of the SATA power connector. Some legacy power supplies that provide 3.3 V power on Pin 3 would force drives with Power Disable feature to get stuck in a hard reset condition preventing them from spinning up. The problem can usually be eliminated by using a simple “Molex to SATA” power adaptor to supply power to these drives.

==== SATA revision 3.4 ====
Released in June 2018, SATA revision 3.4 introduced the following features that enable monitoring of device conditions and execution of housekeeping tasks, both with minimal impact on performance:

- Durable/Ordered Write Notification: enables writing selected critical cache data to the media, minimizing impact on normal operations.
- Device Temperature Monitoring: allows for active monitoring of SATA device temperature and other conditions without impacting normal operation by utilizing the SFF-8609 standard for out-of-band (OOB) communications.
- Device Sleep Signal Timing: provides additional definition to enhance compatibility between manufacturers’ implementations.

==== SATA revision 3.5 ====
Released in July 2020, SATA revision 3.5 introduces features that enable increased performance benefits and promote greater integration of SATA devices and products with other industry I/O standards:

- Device Transmit Emphasis for Gen 3 PHY: aligns SATA with other characteristics of other I/O measurement solutions to help SATA-IO members with testing and integration.
- Defined Ordered NCQ Commands: allows the host to specify the processing relationships among queued commands and sets the order in which commands are processed in the queue.
- Command Duration Limit Features: reduces latency by allowing the host to define quality of service categories, giving the host more granularity in controlling command properties. The feature helps align SATA with the "Fast Fail" requirements established by the Open Compute Project (OCP) and specified in the INCITS T13 Technical Committee standard.

SATA revision 3.5a was released in March 2021.

== Cables, connectors, and ports ==
Connectors and cables present the most visible differences between SATA and parallel ATA drives. Unlike PATA, the same connectors are used on 3.5-inch SATA hard disks (for desktop and server computers) and 2.5-inch disks (for portable or small computers).

Standard SATA connectors for both data and power have a conductor pitch of 1.27 mm (0.050 inches). Low insertion force is required to mate a SATA connector. A smaller mini-SATA or mSATA connector is used by smaller devices such as 1.8-inch SATA drives, some DVD and Blu-ray drives, and mini SSDs.

A special eSATA connector is specified for external devices, and an optionally implemented provision for clips to hold internal connectors firmly in place. SATA drives may be plugged into SAS controllers and communicate on the same physical cable as native SAS disks, but SATA controllers cannot handle SAS disks.

Female SATA ports (on motherboards for example) are for use with SATA data cables that have locks or clips to prevent accidental unplugging. Some SATA cables have right- or left-angled connectors to ease connection to circuit boards.

=== Data connector ===
Standard connector, data segment, host side signal naming
Pin #	Mating	Function
1	1st	Ground
2	2nd	A+ (transmit)
3	2nd	A− (transmit)
4	1st	Ground
5	2nd	B− (receive)
6	2nd	B+ (receive)
7	1st	Ground
—		Coding notch

The SATA standard defines a data cable with seven conductors (three grounds and four active data lines in two pairs) and 8 mm wide wafer connectors on each end. SATA cables can have lengths up to 1 meter (3.3 ft), and connect one motherboard socket to one hard drive. PATA ribbon cables, in comparison, connect one motherboard socket to one or two hard drives, carry either 40 or 80 wires, and are limited to 45 centimeters (18 in) in length by the PATA specification; however, cables up to 90 centimeters (35 in) are readily available. Thus, SATA connectors and cables are easier to fit in closed spaces and reduce obstructions to air cooling. Some cables even include a locking feature, whereby a small (usually metal) spring holds the plug in the socket.

SATA connectors may be straight, upward-angled, downward-angled, leftward-angled, or rightward-angled. Angled connectors allow lower-profile connections. Downward-angled connectors lead the cable immediately away from the drive, on the circuit-board side. Upward-angled connectors lead the cable across the drive towards its top.

One of the problems associated with the transmission of data at high speed over electrical connections is described as noise, which is due to electrical coupling between data circuits and other circuits. As a result, the data circuits can both affect other circuits and be affected by them. Designers use a number of techniques to reduce the undesirable effects of such unintentional coupling. One such technique used in SATA links is differential signaling. This is an enhancement over PATA, which uses single-ended signaling. The use of fully shielded, dual coax conductors, with multiple ground connections, for each differential pair improves isolation between the channels and reduces the chances of lost data in difficult electrical environments.

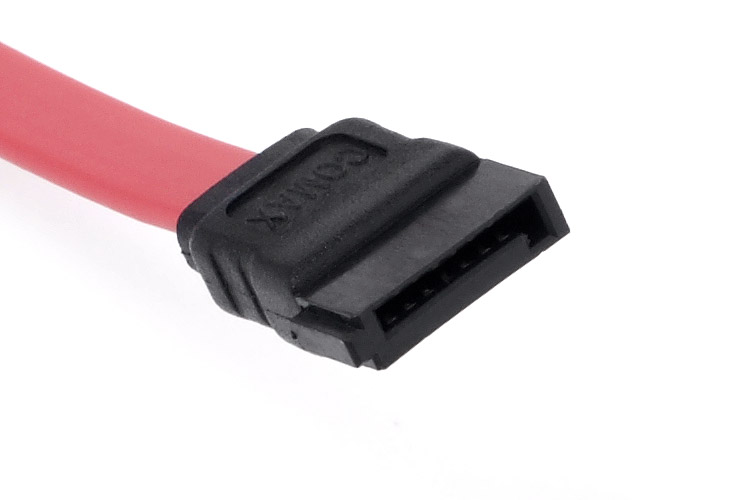
SATA data cable

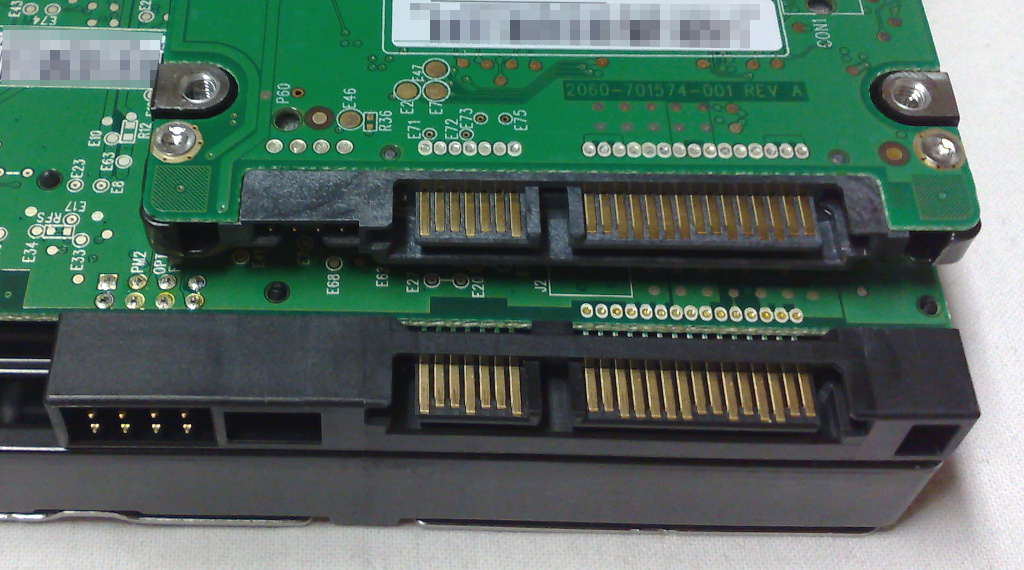
SATA connectors on 2.5 and 3.5-inch hard drives, with data pins on the left and power pins on the right. The two different pin lengths ensure a specific mating order; the longer lengths are ground pins and make contact first. (The cable side has similar variations to achieve three levels of mating order.)

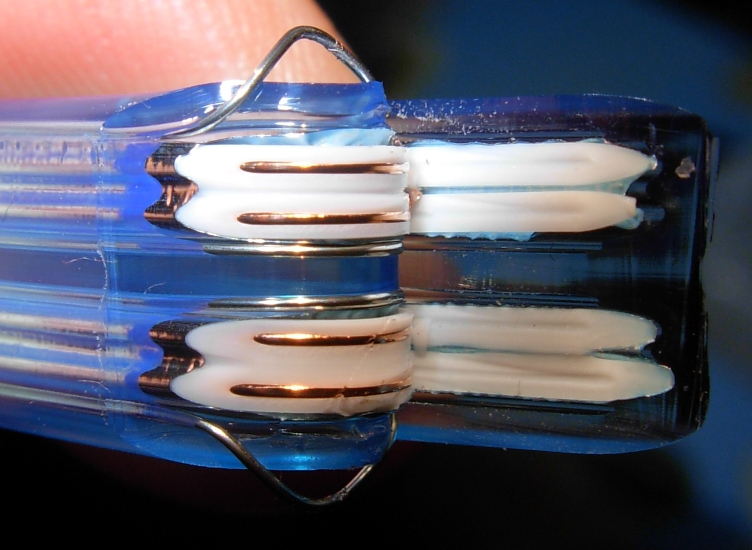
Cut-open SATA cable showing the two foil shielded differential pairs

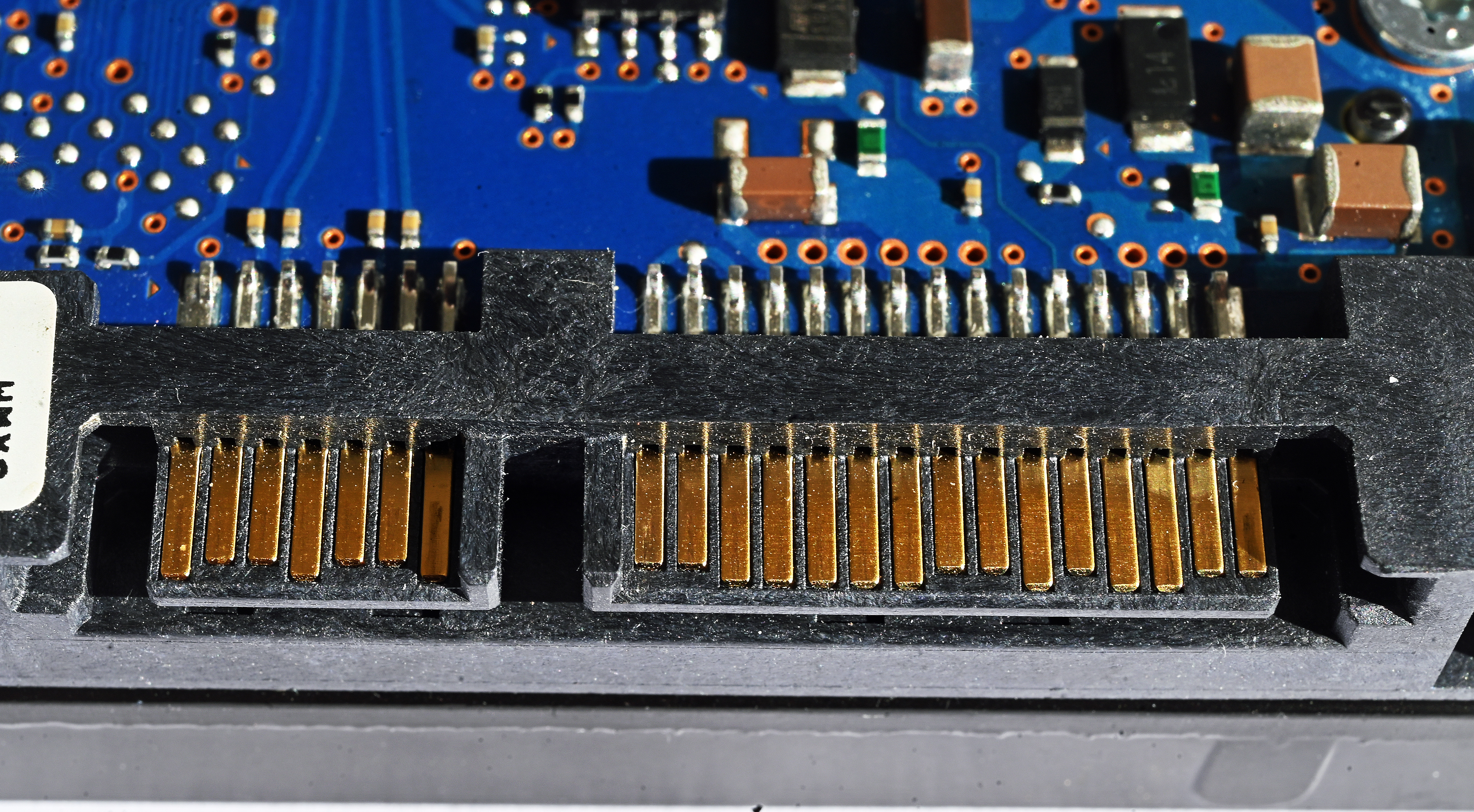
Close-up of SATA data and power connectors

There are SATADOM variants of the connector merging power supply into the 7-pin connector, saving space in industrial setups. The "pin 7" variation repurposes pin 7 for +5V power. The "pin 8" variation repurposes two unnumbered shielding pins for power GND and +5V.

=== SATA power connectors ===
==== Standard power connector (15 pins) ====
Standard connector, power segment
Pin #	Mating	Function
—		Coding notch
1	3rd	Retired (3.3 V power prior to SATA 3.2)
2	3rd	Retired (3.3 V power prior to SATA 3.2)
3	2nd	Enter/exit DevSleep (SATA 3.2+) mode / Enter/exit Power Disable / PWDIS (SATA 3.3+) mode (3.3 V power, pre-charge prior to SATA 3.2)
4	1st	Ground
5	2nd	Ground
6	2nd	Ground
7	2nd	5 V power, pre-charge
8	3rd	5 V power
9	3rd	5 V power
10	2nd	Ground
11	3rd	Staggered spinup / activity signal / direct head unload / vendor specific
12	1st	Ground
13	2nd	12 V power, pre-charge
14	3rd	12 V power
15	3rd	12 V power

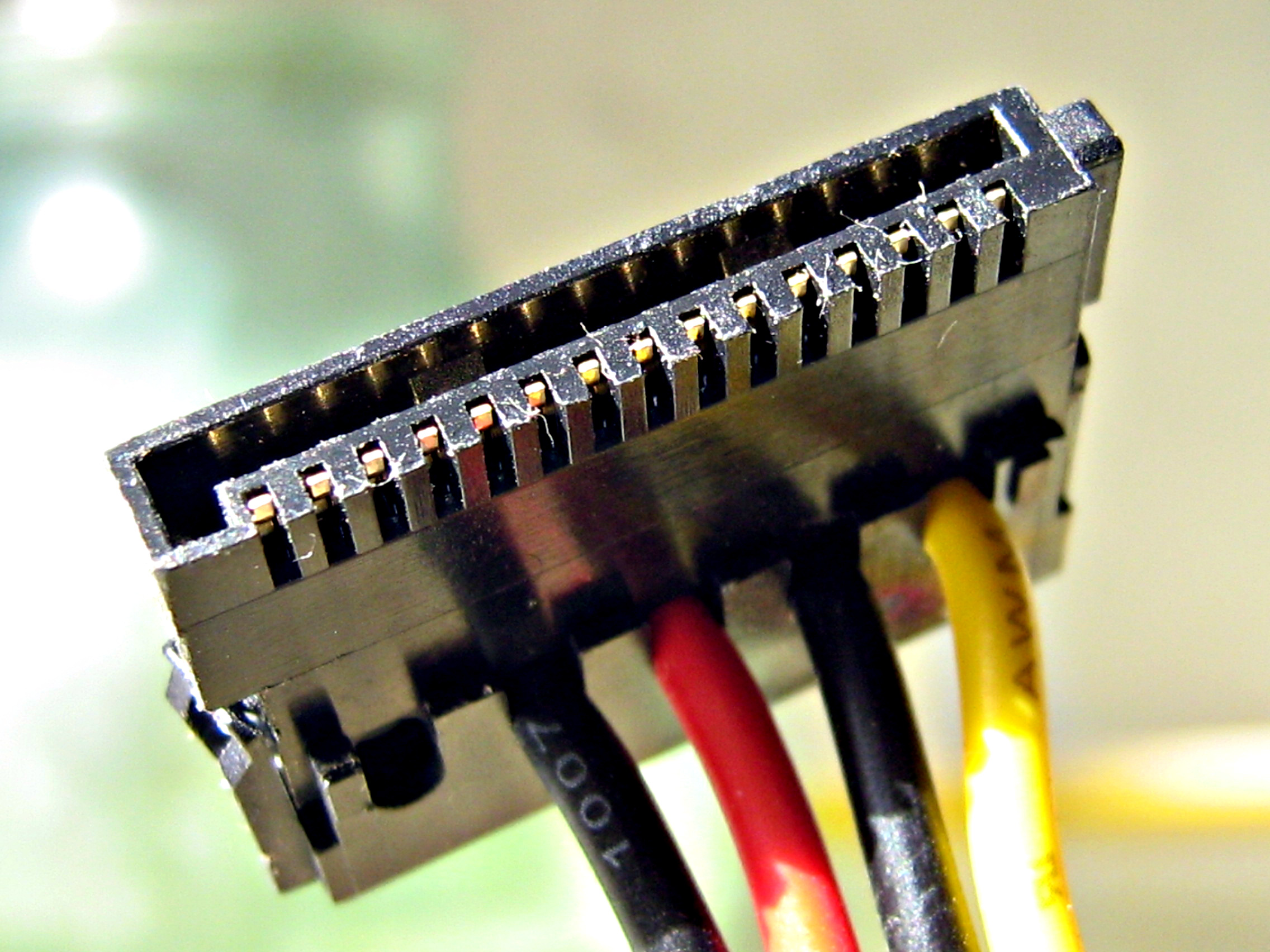
A 15-pin SATA power connector (Pin 1-3 on left omitted.)

SATA specifies a different power connector than the four-pin Molex connector used on Parallel ATA (PATA) devices (and earlier small storage devices, going back to ST-506 hard disk drives and even to floppy disk drives that predated the IBM PC). It is a wafer-type connector, like the SATA data connector, but much wider (fifteen pins versus seven) to avoid confusion between the two. Some early SATA drives included the four-pin Molex power connector together with the new fifteen-pin connector, but most SATA drives now have only the latter.

The new SATA power connector contains many more pins for several reasons:

- 3.3 V is supplied along with the traditional 5 V and 12 V supplies. However, very few drives actually use it.
- Pin 3 in SATA revision 3.3 has been redefined as PWDIS and is used to enter and exit the POWER DISABLE mode in line with SAS-3. If Pin 3 is driven HIGH (2.1–3.6 V max), power to the drive circuitry is cut. Pins 1 and 2 are redefined as retired and no longer used for any purpose. Drives with this feature enabled do not power up in systems designed to SATA revision 3.1 or earlier, because Pin 3 driven HIGH prevents the drive from powering up. Workarounds include using a Molex adapter without 3.3 V, putting thin low-friction thermal-resistant insulating tape (e.g. kapton tape) over the PWDIS pin or physically removing the pin.
- To reduce resistance and increase current capability, each voltage is supplied by three pins in parallel, though one pin in each group is intended for precharging (see below). Each pin should be able to carry 1.5 A.
- Five parallel pins provide a low-resistance ground connection.
- Two ground pins and one pin for each supplied voltage support hot-plug precharging. Ground pins 4 and 12 in a hot-swap cable are the longest, so they make contact first when the connectors are mated. Drive power connector pins 3, 7, and 13 are longer than the others, so they make contact next. The drive uses them to charge its internal bypass capacitors through current-limiting resistances. Finally, the remaining power pins make contact, bypassing the resistances and providing a low-resistance source of each voltage. This two-step mating process avoids glitches to other loads and possible arcing or erosion of the SATA power-connector contacts.
- Pin 11 might be used (often by chassis or backplane hardware independent from SATA host controller and its data connection) for staggered spinup, activity indication, emergency head parking, or other vendor defined functions in various combinations. It is an open-collector signal, which may be pulled down by the connector or the drive.
  - Host signaling: If pulled down at the connector (as it is on most cable-style SATA power connectors), the drive spins up as soon as power is applied. If left floating, the drive waits until it is spoken to. This prevents many drives from spinning up simultaneously, which might draw too much power.
  - Drive signaling: The pin is also pulled low by the drive to indicate drive activity. This may be used to give feedback to the user through an LED. Relevant definitions of pin operation have changed multiple times in published revisions of SATA standard, so the observed behavior may be dependent on device version, host version, firmware and software configuration. There is also a specification for transmission of drive temperature and other status values with activity signal pulses routinely used to make LED blink.

Passive adapters are available that convert a four-pin Molex connector to a SATA power connector, providing the 5 V and 12 V lines available on the Molex connector, but not 3.3 V. There are also four-pin Molex-to-SATA power adapters that include electronics to additionally provide the 3.3 V power supply. However, very few devices have required the 3.3 V power line. For many years pin 3, originally one of the three 3.3 V lines, has been used as PWDIS (POWER DISABLE); it a device supporting PWDIS was presented with 3.3 V on an older host it would not work. In SATA Revision 3.5 the 3.3 V supply was officially discontinued.

Like SATA data connectors, SATA power connectors may be straight or angled upward or downward.

==== Slimline power connector (6 pins) ====
Slimline connector, power segment
Pin #	Mating	Function
—		Coding notch
1	3rd	Device presence
2	2nd	5 V power
3	2nd	5 V power
4	2nd	Manufacturing diagnostic
5	1st	Ground
6	1st	Ground

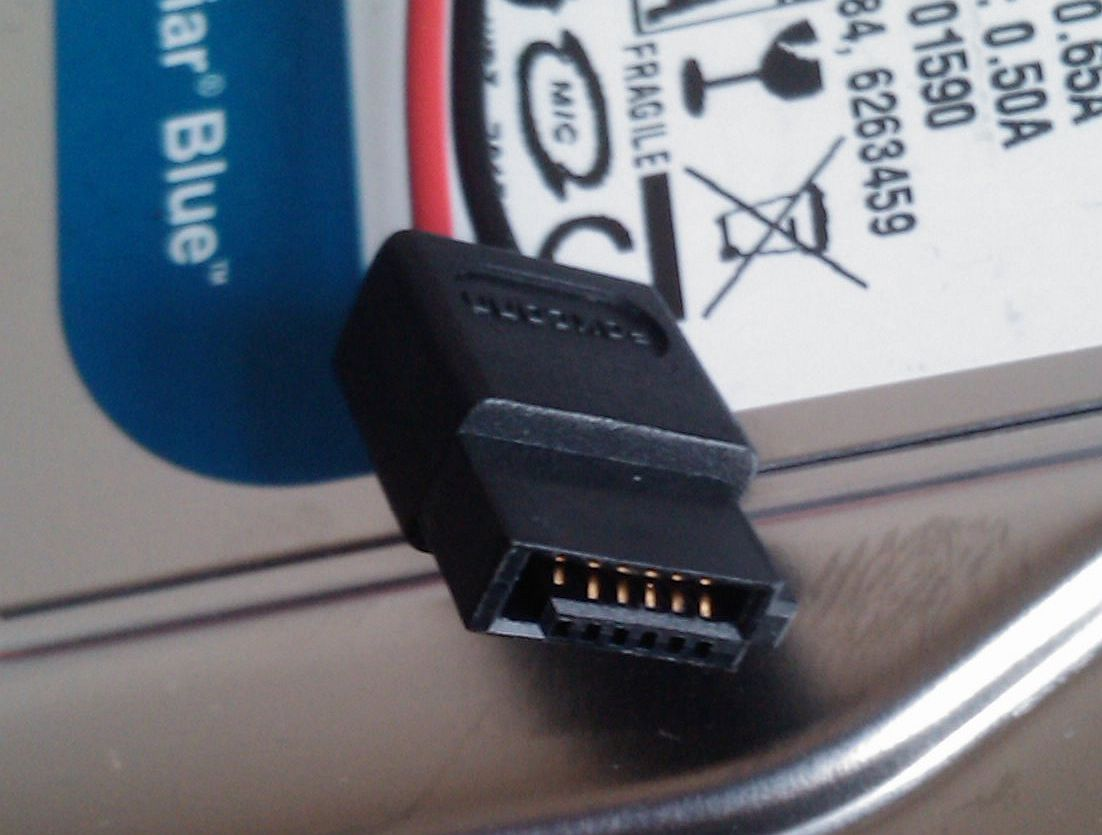
A six-pin slimline SATA power connector

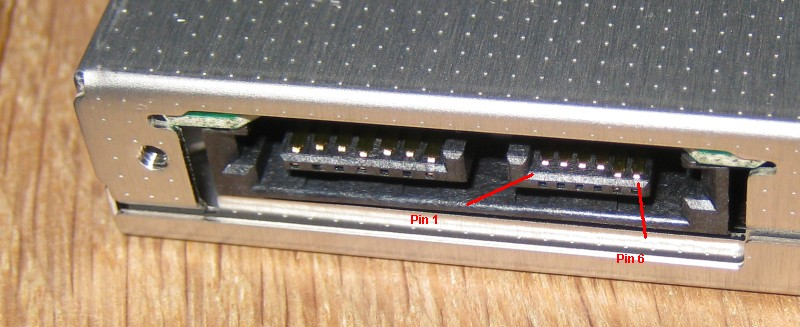
The back of a SATA-based slimline optical drive

The power connector is reduced to six pins so it supplies only +5 V (red wire), and not +12 V or +3.3 V. Pin 1 of the slimline power connector, denoting device presence, is shorter than the others to allow hot-swapping.

Note: The data connector used is the same as the non-slimline version.

SATA 2.6 is the first revision that defined the slimline power connector targeted for smaller form-factor drives, such as laptop optical drives.

==== Micro connector ====
Micro connector, power segment
Pin #	Mating	Function
1	3rd	3.3 V power
2	2nd	3.3 V power
3	1st	Ground
4	1st	Ground
5	2nd	5 V power
6	3rd	5 V power
7	3rd	Reserved
—		Coding notch
8	3rd	Vendor specific
9	2nd	Vendor specific

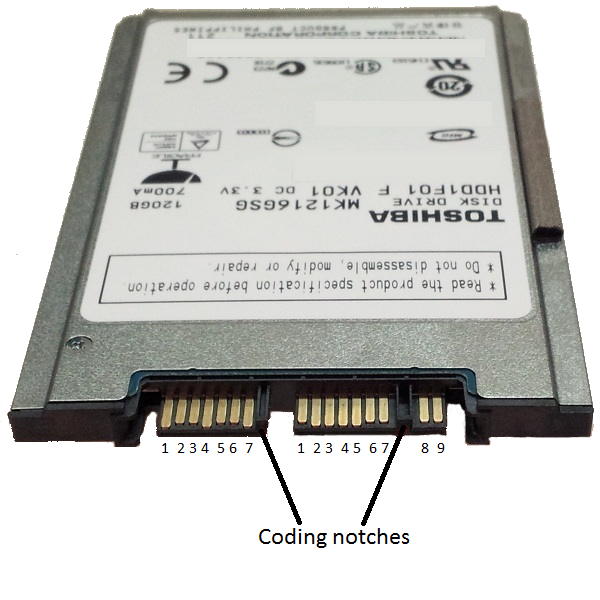
A 1.8-inch micro SATA hard drive with numbered data and power pins on the connector

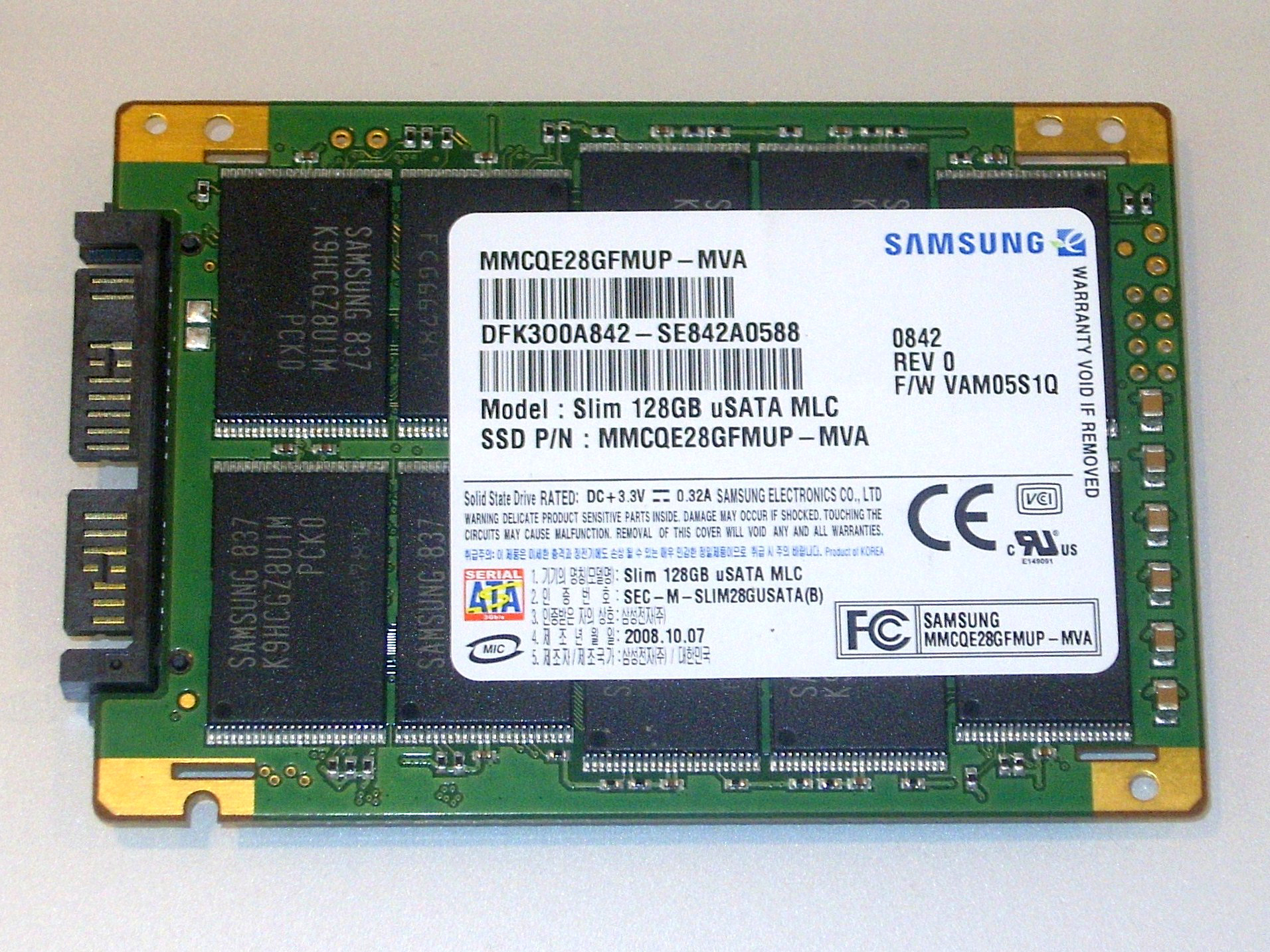
Samsung 128 GB micro SATA solid-state drive

The micro SATA connector (sometimes called uSATA or μSATA) originated with SATA 2.6, and is intended for 1.8-inch hard disk drives. There is also a micro data connector, similar in appearance but slightly thinner than the standard data connector.

=== Additional pins ===
Some SATA drives, in particular mechanical ones, come with an extra 4 or more jumper pin interface which isn't uniformly standardized but nevertheless serves similar purpose defined by each drive manufacturer. As IDE drives used those extra pins for setting up Master and Slave drives, on SATA drives, those pins are generally used to select different Power modes for use in USB-SATA bridges or enables additional features like Spread Spectrum Clocking, SATA Speed Limit or Factory Mode for Diagnostics and Recovery, by the use of a jumper.

=== eSATA ===
The official eSATA logo

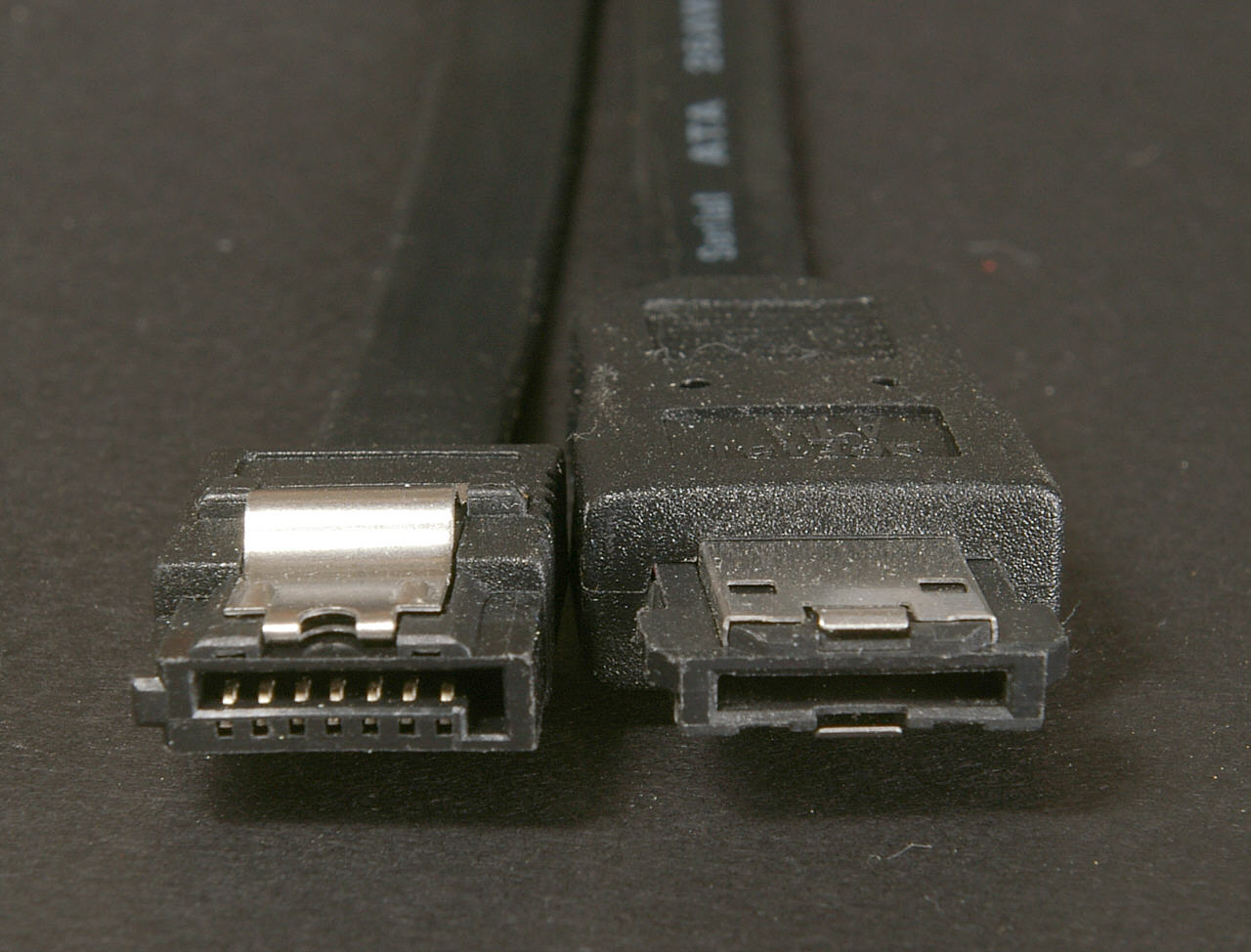
SATA (left) and eSATA (right) connectors

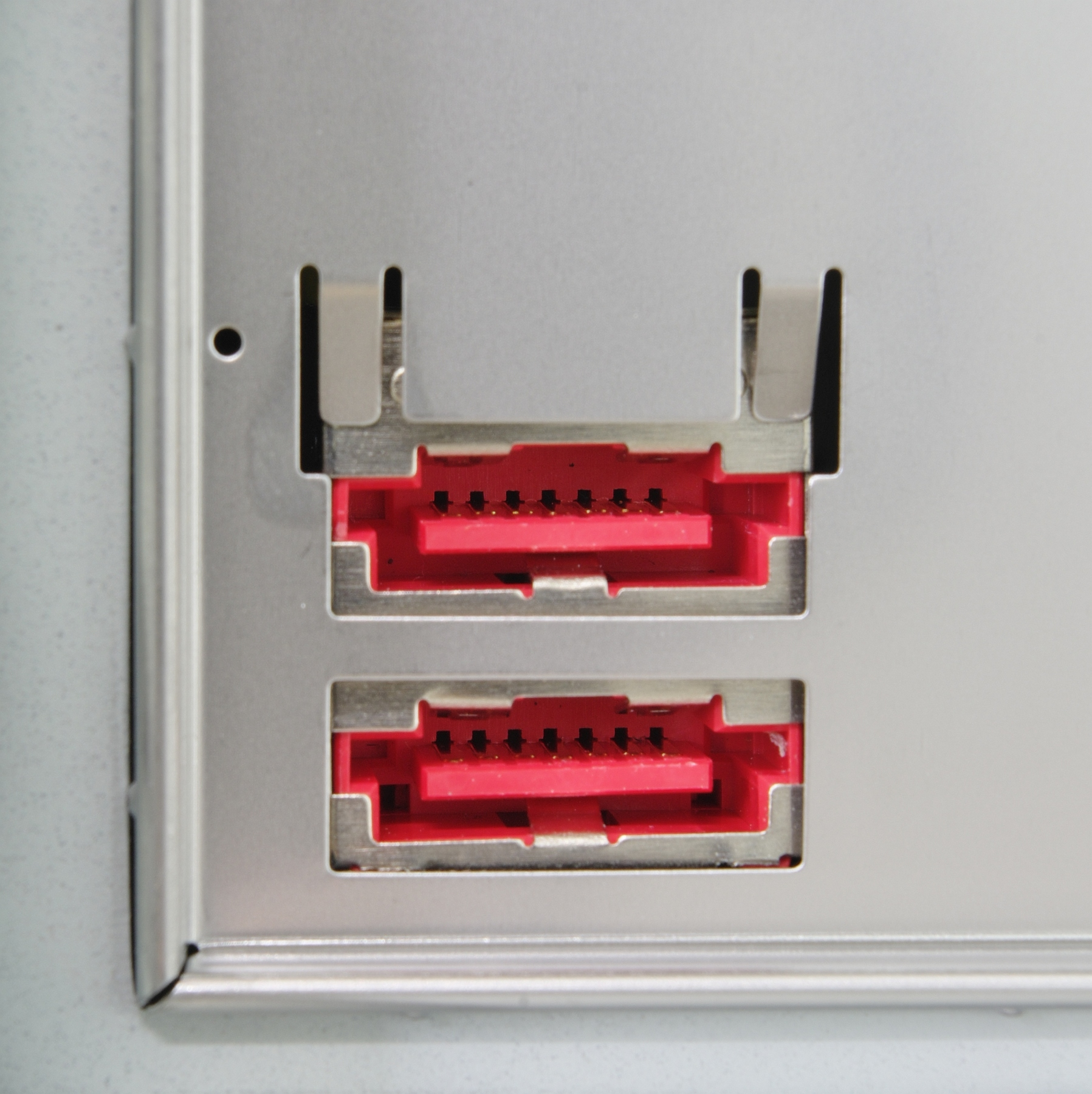
eSATA ports

Standardized in 2004, eSATA (e standing for external) provides a variant of SATA meant for external connectivity. It uses a more robust connector, longer shielded cables, and stricter (but backward-compatible) electrical standards. The protocol and logical signaling (link/transport layers and above) are identical to internal SATA. The differences are:

- Minimum transmit amplitude increased: Range is 500–600 mV instead of 400–600 mV.
- Minimum receive amplitude decreased: Range is 240–600 mV instead of 325–600 mV.
- Maximum cable length increased to 2 meters (6.6 ft) from 1 meter (3.3 ft).
- The eSATA cable and connector is similar to the SATA 1.0a cable and connector, with these exceptions:
  - The eSATA connector is mechanically different to prevent unshielded internal cables from being used externally. The eSATA connector discards the L-shaped key and changes the position and size of the guides.
  - The eSATA insertion depth is deeper: 6.6 mm instead of 5 mm. The contact positions are also changed.
  - The eSATA cable has an extra shield to reduce EMI to FCC and CE requirements. Internal cables do not need the extra shield to satisfy EMI requirements because they are inside a shielded case.
  - The eSATA connector uses metal springs for shield contact and mechanical retention.
  - The eSATA connector has a design-life of 5,000 matings; the ordinary SATA connector is only specified for 50.

Aimed at the consumer market, eSATA enters an external storage market served also by the USB and FireWire interfaces. The SATA interface has certain advantages. Most external hard-disk-drive cases with FireWire or USB interfaces use either PATA or SATA drives and "bridges" to translate between the drives' interfaces and the enclosures' external ports; this bridging incurs some inefficiency. Some single disks can transfer 157 MB/s during real use, about four times the maximum transfer rate of USB 2.0 or FireWire 400 (IEEE 1394a) and almost twice as fast as the maximum transfer rate of FireWire 800. The S3200 FireWire 1394b specification reaches around 400 MB/s (3.2 Gbit/s), and USB 3.0 has a nominal speed of 5 Gbit/s. Some low-level drive features, such as S.M.A.R.T., may not operate through some USB or FireWire or USB+FireWire bridges; eSATA does not suffer from these issues provided that the controller manufacturer (and its drivers) presents eSATA drives as ATA devices, rather than as SCSI devices, as has been common with Silicon Image, JMicron, and Nvidia nForce drivers for Windows Vista. In those cases SATA drives do not have low-level features accessible.

The eSATA version of SATA 6G operates at 6.0 Gbit/s (the term "SATA III" is avoided by the SATA-IO organization to prevent confusion with SATA II 3.0 Gbit/s, which was colloquially referred to as "SATA 3G" [bit/s] or "SATA 300" [MB/s] since the 1.5 Gbit/s SATA I and 1.5 Gbit/s SATA II were referred to as both "SATA 1.5G" [bit/s] or "SATA 150" [MB/s]). Therefore, eSATA connections operate with negligible differences between them. Once an interface can transfer data as fast as a drive can handle them, increasing the interface speed does not improve data transfer.

There are some disadvantages, however, to the eSATA interface:

- Devices built before the eSATA interface became popular lack external SATA connectors.
- For small form-factor devices (such as external 2.5-inch disks), a PC-hosted USB or FireWire link can usually supply sufficient power to operate the device. However, eSATA connectors cannot supply power, and require a power supply for the external device. The related eSATAp (but mechanically incompatible, sometimes called eSATA/USB) connector adds power to an external SATA connection, so that an additional power supply is not needed.

As of August 2017 few new computers have dedicated external SATA (eSATA) connectors, with USB3 dominating and USB3 Type C, often with the Thunderbolt alternate mode, starting to replace the earlier USB connectors. Still sometimes present are single ports supporting both USB3 and eSATA.

Desktop computers without a built-in eSATA interface can install an eSATA host bus adapter (HBA); if the motherboard supports SATA, an externally available eSATA connector can be added. Notebook computers with the now rare Cardbus or ExpressCard could add an eSATA HBA. With passive adapters, the maximum cable length is reduced to 1 meter (3.3 ft) due to the absence of compliant eSATA signal-levels.

==== eSATAp ====
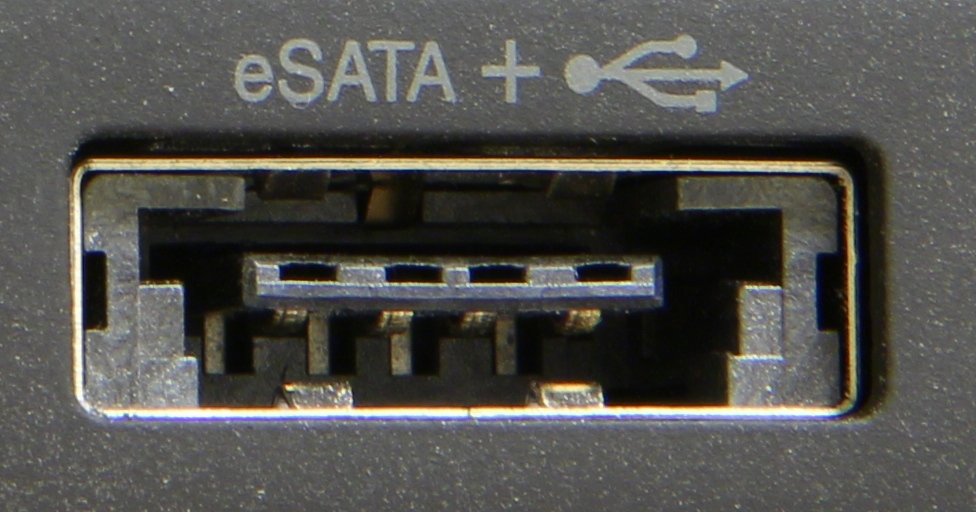
eSATAp port

eSATAp stands for powered eSATA. It is also known as Power over eSATA, Power eSATA, eSATA/USB Combo, or eSATA USB Hybrid Port (EUHP). An eSATAp port combines the four pins of the USB 2.0 (or earlier) port, the seven pins of the eSATA port, and optionally two 12 V power pins. Both SATA traffic and device power are integrated in a single cable, as is the case with USB but not eSATA. The 5 V power is provided through two USB pins, while the 12 V power may optionally be provided. Typically desktop, but not notebook, computers provide 12 V power, so can power devices requiring this voltage, typically 3.5-inch disk and CD/DVD drives, in addition to 5 V devices such as 2.5-inch drives.

Both USB and eSATA devices can be used with an eSATAp port, when plugged in with a USB or eSATA cable, respectively. An eSATA device cannot be powered via an eSATAp cable, but a special cable can make both SATA or eSATA and power connectors available from an eSATAp port.

An eSATAp connector can be built into a computer with internal SATA and USB, by fitting a bracket with connections for internal SATA, USB, and power connectors and an externally accessible eSATAp port. Though eSATAp connectors have been built into several devices, manufacturers do not refer to an official standard.

==== Pre-standard implementations ====
- Prior to the final eSATA 6 Gbit/s specification many add-on cards and some motherboards advertised eSATA 6 Gbit/s support because they had 6 Gbit/s SATA 3.0 controllers for internal-only solutions. Those implementations are non-standard, and eSATA 6 Gbit/s requirements were ratified in the July 18, 2011 SATA 3.1 specification. Some products might not be fully eSATA 6 Gbit/s compliant.

=== Mini-SATA (mSATA) ===
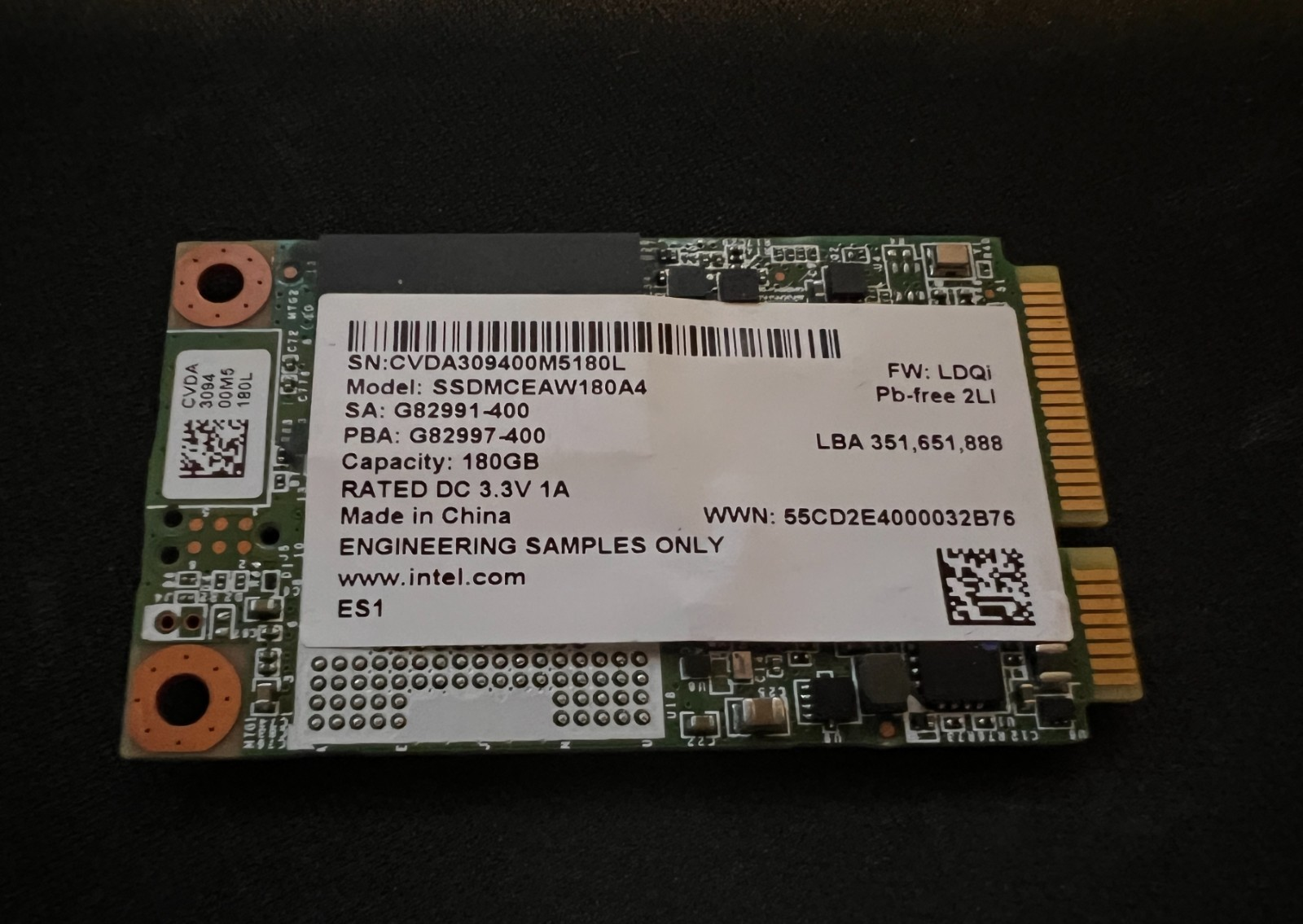
An mSATA SSD

Mini-SATA (abbreviated as mSATA), which is distinct from the micro connector, was announced by the Serial ATA International Organization on September 21, 2009. Applications include netbooks, laptops and other devices that require a solid-state drive in a small footprint.

The physical dimensions of the mSATA connector are identical to those of the PCI Express Mini Card interface, but the interfaces are electrically incompatible; the data signals (TX±/RX± SATA, PETn0 PETp0 PERn0 PERp0 PCI Express) need a connection to the SATA host controller instead of the PCI Express host controller.

The M.2 specification has superseded both mSATA and PCI Express Mini.

=== SFF-8784 connector ===
SFF-8784 connector
Bottom				Top			
Pin	Function	Pin	Function	Pin	Function	Pin	Function
1	Ground	6	Unused	11	Ground	16	+5 V
2	Ground	7	+5 V	12	B+ (transmit)	17	Ground
3	Ground	8	Unused	13	B− (transmit)	18	A− (receive)
4	Ground (Note: Drive present)	9	Unused	14	Ground	19	A+ (receive)
5	LED	10	Ground	15	+5 V	20	Ground

Slim 2.5-inch SATA devices, 5 mm (0.20 inches) in height, use the twenty-pin SFF-8784 edge connector to save space. By combining the data signals and power lines into a slim connector that effectively enables direct connection to the device's printed circuit board (PCB) without additional space-consuming connectors, SFF-8784 allows further internal layout compaction for portable devices such as ultrabooks.

Pins 1 to 10 are on the connector's bottom side, while pins 11 to 20 are on the top side.

=== SATA Express ===
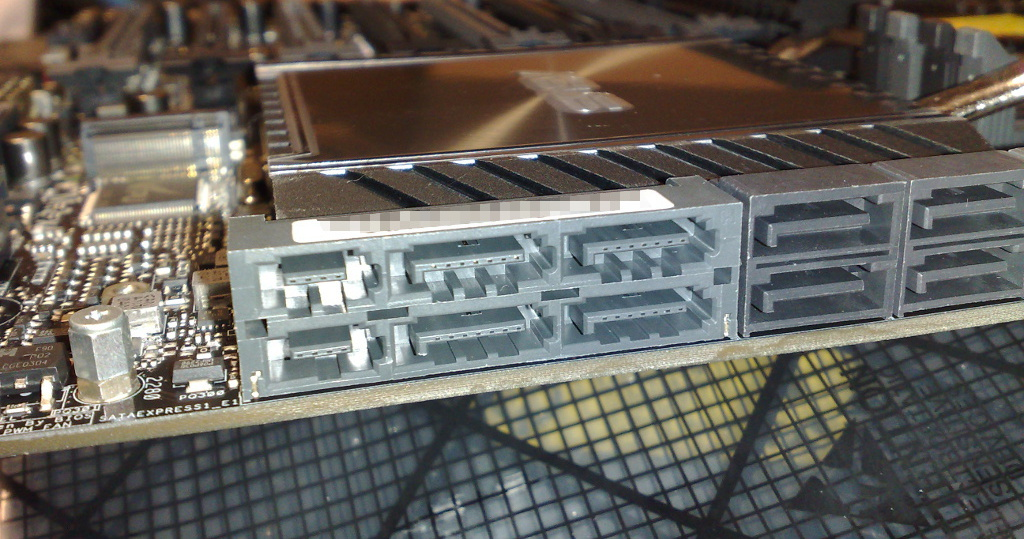
Two SATA Express connectors (light gray) on a computer motherboard; to the right of them are common SATA connectors (dark gray).

SATA Express, initially standardized in the SATA 3.2 specification, is an interface that supports either SATA or PCI Express storage devices. The host connector is backward compatible with the standard 3.5-inch SATA data connector, allowing up to two legacy SATA devices to connect. At the same time, the host connector provides up to two PCI Express 3.0 lanes as a pure PCI Express connection to the storage device, allowing bandwidths of up to 2 GB/s.

Instead of the otherwise usual approach of doubling the native speed of the SATA interface, PCI Express was selected for achieving data transfer speeds greater than 6 Gbit/s. It was concluded that doubling the native SATA speed would take too much time, too many changes would be required to the SATA standard, and would result in a much greater power consumption when compared to the existing PCI Express bus.

In addition to supporting legacy Advanced Host Controller Interface (AHCI), SATA Express also makes it possible for NVM Express (NVMe) to be used as the logical device interface for connected PCI Express storage devices.

As M.2 form factor, described below, achieved much larger popularity, SATA Express is considered as a failed standard and dedicated ports quickly disappeared from motherboards.

=== M.2 (NGFF) ===
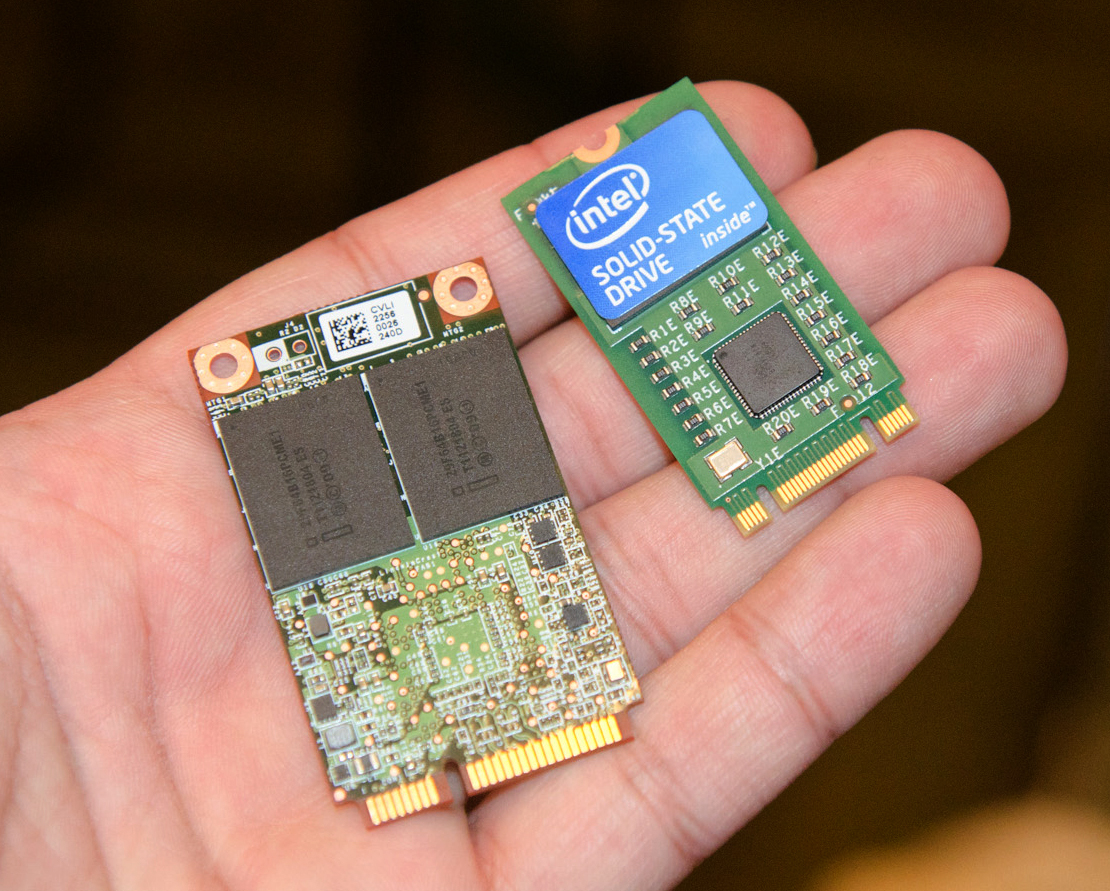
Size comparison of mSATA (left) and M.2 (size 2242, B+M keyed, right) SSDs

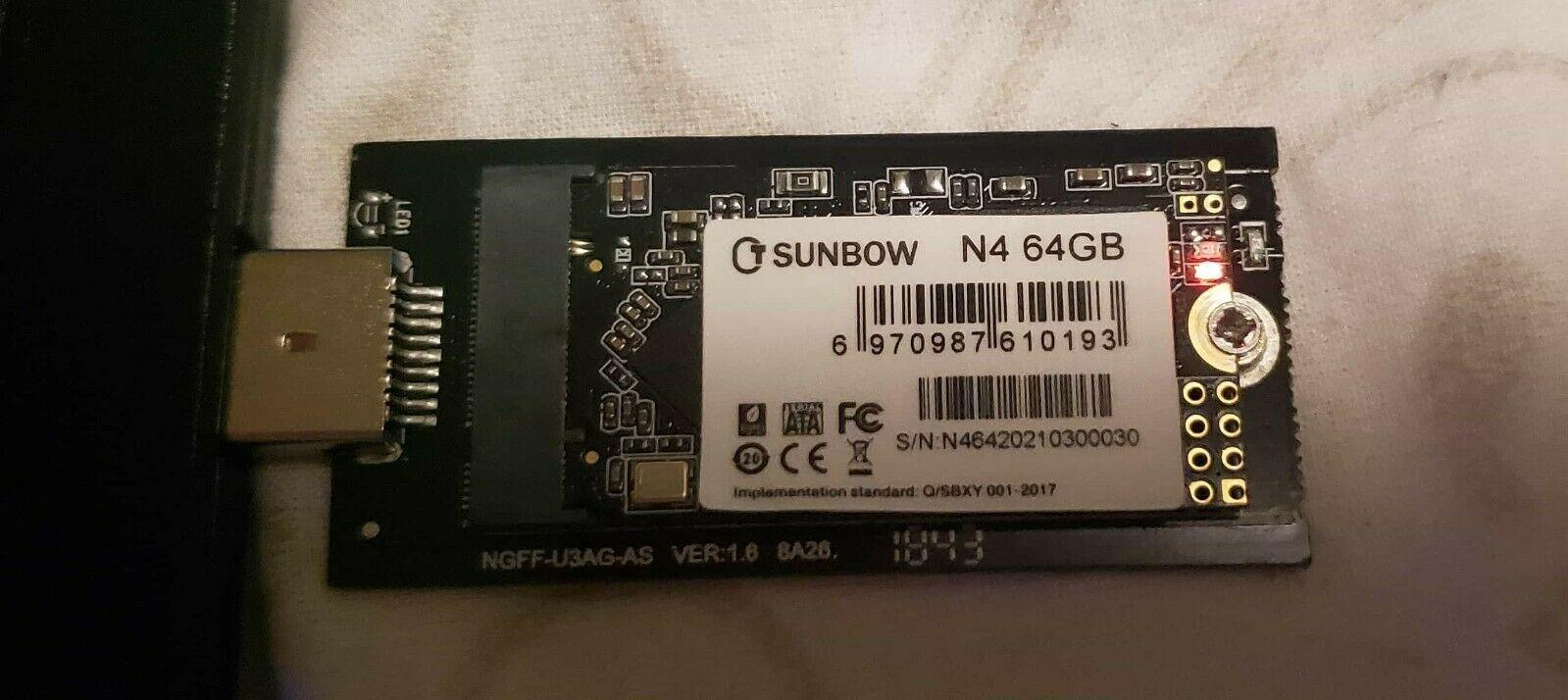
An M.2 (2242) solid-state-drive (SSD) connected into USB 3.0 adapter and connected to computer

M.2, formerly known as the Next Generation Form Factor (NGFF), is a specification for computer expansion cards and associated connectors. It replaces the mSATA standard, which uses the PCI Express Mini Card physical layout. Having a smaller and more flexible physical specification, together with more advanced features, the M.2 is more suitable for solid-state storage applications in general, especially when used in small devices such as ultrabooks or tablets.

A M.2 SSD is "keyed" to prevent insertion of a card connector (male) to an incompatible socket (female) on the host. Typically, M.2 SSDs with a B key or B+M key are SATA, while M.2 SSDs with M key only are mostly NVMe only and incompatible with SATA.

The M.2 standard is designed as a revision and improvement to the mSATA standard, so that larger printed circuit boards (PCBs) can be manufactured. While mSATA took advantage of the existing PCI Express Mini Card form factor and connector, M.2 has been designed to maximize usage of the card space, while minimizing the footprint.

Supported host controller interfaces and internally provided ports are a superset to those defined by the SATA Express interface. Essentially, the M.2 standard is a small form factor implementation of the SATA Express interface, with the addition of an internal USB 3.0 port.

=== U.2 (SFF-8639) ===
U.2, formerly known as SFF-8639. Like M.2, it carries a PCI Express electrical signal, however U.2 uses a PCIe 3.0 ×4 link providing a higher bandwidth of 32 Gbit/s in each direction. In order to provide maximum backward compatibility the U.2 connector also supports SATA and multi-path SAS.

== Topology ==
SATA topology: host (H), multiplier (M), and device (D)

SATA uses a point-to-point architecture. The physical connection between a controller and a storage device is not shared among other controllers and storage devices. SATA defines multipliers, which allows a single SATA controller port to drive up to fifteen storage devices. The multiplier performs the function of a hub; the controller and each storage device is connected to the hub. This is conceptually similar to SAS expanders.

Modern PC systems have SATA controllers built into the motherboard, typically featuring two to eight ports. Additional ports can be installed through add-in SATA host adapters (available in variety of bus-interfaces: USB, PCI, PCIe).

== Backward and forward compatibility ==
=== SATA and PATA ===
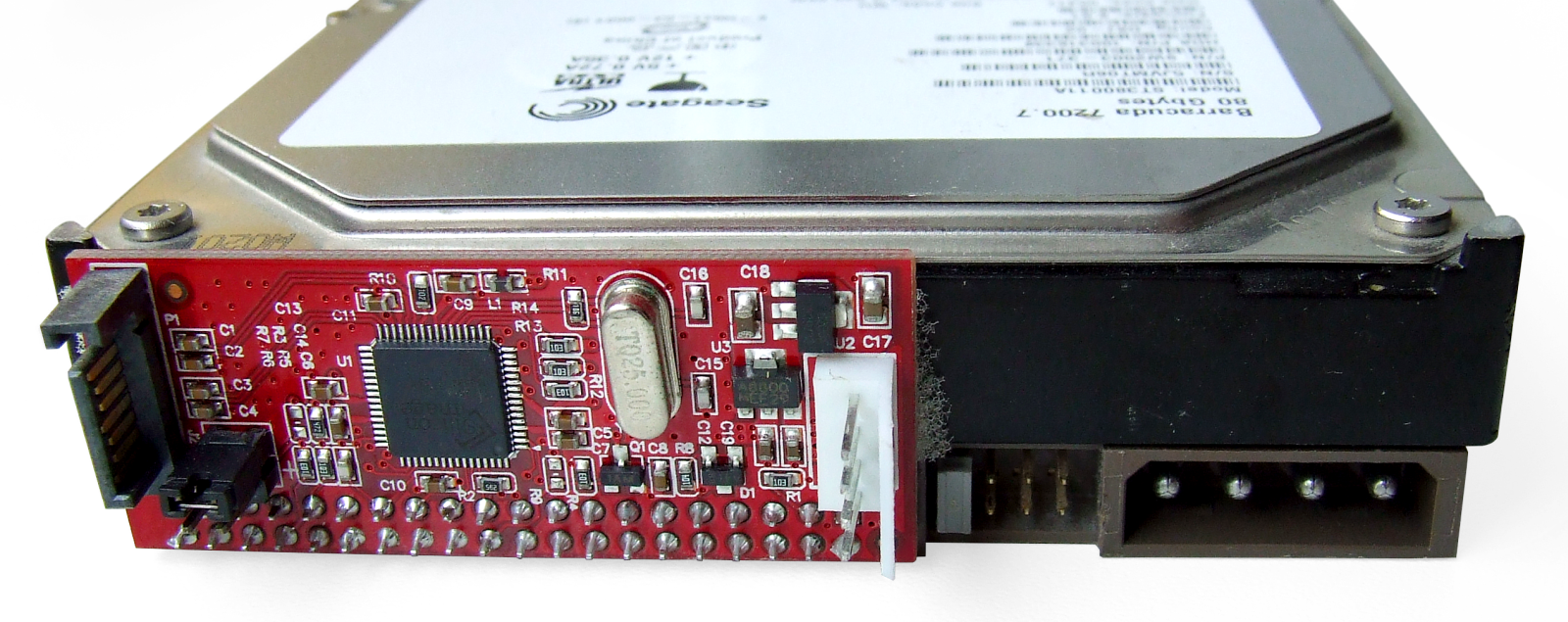
PATA hard disk with SATA converter attached

At the hardware interface level, SATA and PATA (Parallel AT Attachment) devices are completely incompatible: they cannot be interconnected without an adapter.

At the application level, SATA devices can be specified to look and act like PATA devices.

Many motherboards offer a "Legacy Mode" option, which makes SATA drives appear to the OS like PATA drives on a standard controller. This Legacy Mode eases OS installation by not requiring that a specific driver be loaded during setup, but sacrifices support for some (vendor specific) features of SATA. Legacy Mode often if not always disables some of the boards' PATA or SATA ports, since the standard PATA controller interface supports only four drives. (Often, which ports are disabled is configurable.)

The common heritage of the ATA command set has enabled the proliferation of low-cost PATA to SATA bridge chips. Bridge chips were widely used on PATA drives (before the completion of native SATA drives) as well in standalone converters. When attached to a PATA drive, a device-side converter allows the PATA drive to function as a SATA drive. Host-side converters allow a motherboard PATA port to connect to a SATA drive.

The market has produced powered enclosures for both PATA and SATA drives that interface to the PC through USB, Firewire or eSATA, with the restrictions noted above. PCI cards with a SATA connector exist that allow SATA drives to connect to legacy systems without SATA connectors.

=== SATA 1.5 Gbit/s and SATA 3 Gbit/s ===
The designers of SATA standard as an overall goal aimed for backward and forward compatibility with future revisions of the SATA standard. To prevent interoperability problems that could occur when next generation SATA drives are installed on motherboards with standard legacy SATA 1.5 Gbit/s host controllers, many manufacturers have made it easy to switch those newer drives to the previous standard's mode. Examples of such provisions include:

- Seagate/Maxtor has added a user-accessible jumper-switch, known as the "force 150", to enable the drive switch between forced 1.5 Gbit/s and 1.5/3 Gbit/s negotiated operation.
- Western Digital uses a jumper setting called OPT1 enabled to force 1.5 Gbit/s data transfer speed (OPT1 is enabled by putting the jumper on pins 5 and 6).
- Samsung drives can be forced to 1.5 Gbit/s mode using software that may be downloaded from the manufacturer's website. Configuring some Samsung drives in this manner requires the temporary use of a SATA-2 (SATA 3.0 Gbit/s) controller while programming the drive.

The "force 150" switch (or equivalent) is also useful for attaching SATA 3 Gbit/s hard drives to SATA controllers on PCI cards, since many of these controllers (such as the Silicon Image chips) run at 3 Gbit/s, even though the PCI bus cannot reach 1.5 Gbit/s speeds. This can cause data corruption in operating systems that do not specifically test for this condition and limit the disk transfer speed.

=== SATA 3 Gbit/s and SATA 6 Gbit/s ===
SATA 3 Gbit/s and SATA 6 Gbit/s are compatible with each other. Most devices that are only SATA 3 Gbit/s can connect with devices that are SATA 6 Gbit/s, and vice versa, though SATA 3 Gbit/s devices connect with SATA 6 Gbit/s devices only at the slower 3 Gbit/s speed.

=== SATA 1.5 Gbit/s and SATA 6 Gbit/s ===
SATA 1.5 Gbit/s and SATA 6 Gbit/s are compatible with each other. Most devices that are only SATA 1.5 Gbit/s can connect with devices that are SATA 6 Gbit/s, and vice versa, though SATA 1.5 Gbit/s devices only connect with SATA 6 Gbit/s devices at the slower 1.5 Gbit/s speed.

== Comparison to other interfaces ==
=== SATA and SCSI ===
Parallel SCSI uses a more complex bus than SATA, usually resulting in higher manufacturing costs. SCSI buses also allow connection of several drives on one shared channel, whereas SATA allows one drive per channel, unless using a port multiplier. Serial Attached SCSI uses the same physical interconnects as SATA, and most SAS HBAs also support 3 and 6 Gbit/s SATA devices (an HBA requires support for Serial ATA Tunneling Protocol).

SATA 3 Gbit/s theoretically offers a maximum bandwidth of 300 MB/s per device, which is only slightly lower than the rated speed for SCSI Ultra 320 with a maximum of 320 MB/s total for all devices on a bus. SCSI drives provide greater sustained throughput than multiple SATA drives connected via a simple (i.e., command-based) port multiplier because of disconnect-reconnect and aggregating performance. In general, SATA devices link compatibly to SAS enclosures and adapters, whereas SCSI devices cannot be directly connected to a SATA bus.

SCSI, SAS, and fibre-channel (FC) drives are more expensive than SATA, so they are used in servers and disk arrays where the better performance justifies the additional cost. Inexpensive ATA and SATA drives evolved in the home-computer market, hence there is a view that they are less reliable. As those two worlds overlapped, the subject of reliability became somewhat controversial. Note that, in general, the failure rate of a disk drive is related to the quality of its heads, platters and supporting manufacturing processes, not to its interface.

Use of serial ATA in the business market increased from 22% in 2006 to 28% in 2008.

=== Comparison with other buses ===
SCSI-3 devices with SCA-2 connectors are designed for hot swapping. Many server and RAID systems provide hardware support for transparent hot swapping. The designers of the SCSI standard prior to SCA-2 connectors did not target hot swapping, but in practice, most RAID implementations support hot swapping of hard disks.

Name	Raw data rate	Data rate	Maximum cable length	Power provided	Devices per channel
eSATA	6 Gbit/s	600 MB/s	2 m; 1 m with passive SATA adapter	No	1 (15 with a port multiplier)
eSATAp	6 Gbit/s	600 MB/s	2 m; 1 m with passive SATA adapter	5 V, and, optionally, 12 V	1 (15 with a port multiplier)
SATA Express	16 Gbit/s	1.97 GB/s (Note: 16 Gbit/s raw bit rate, with 128b/130b encoding)	1 m	No	1 (15 with a port multiplier)
SATA revision 3.0	6 Gbit/s	600 MB/s	1 m	No	1 (15 with a port multiplier)
SATA revision 2.0	3 Gbit/s	300 MB/s	1 m	No	1 (15 with a port multiplier)
SATA revision 1.0	1.5 Gbit/s	150 MB/s	1 m	No	1
PATA (IDE) 133	1.064 Gbit/s	133.3 MB/s (Note: 15 ns cycles, 16-bit transfers)	0.46 m (18 in)	5 V (only 2.5-inch drive 44-pin connector)	2
SAS-4	22.5 Gbit/s	2.25 GB/s	10 m	Backplane connectors only	1 (> 65k with expanders)
SAS-3	12 Gbit/s	1.2 GB/s	10 m	Backplane connectors only	1 (> 65k with expanders)
SAS-2	6 Gbit/s	600 MB/s	10 m	Backplane connectors only	1 (> 65k with expanders)
SAS-1	3 Gbit/s	300 MB/s	10 m	Backplane connectors only	1 (> 65k with expanders)
IEEE 1394 (FireWire) 800	786 Mbit/s	98.25 MB/s	100 m	15 W, 12–25 V	63 (with a hub)
IEEE 1394 (FireWire) 400	393 Mbit/s	49.13 MB/s	4.5 m	15 W, 12–25 V	63 (with a hub)
USB 3.2 (Generation 2x2)	20 Gbit/s	2.44 GB/s (Note: 20 Gbit/s raw bit rate, with 128b/132b encoding)	1 m (Passive cable USB-IF Standard)	Yes 100 W, 5, 12 or 20 V	127 (with a hub)
USB 3.1 (Generation 2)	10 Gbit/s	1.22 GB/s (Note: 10 Gbit/s raw bit rate, with 128b/132b encoding)	1 m (Passive cable USB-IF Standard)	100 W, 5, 12 or 20 V	127 (with a hub)
USB 3.0 (Note: USB 3.0 specification was released to hardware vendors on 17 November 2008.) (USB 3.2, Generation 1)	5 Gbit/s	610 MB/s or more (excl. protocol overhead, flow control, and framing)	2 m (Passive cable USB-IF Standard)	4.5 W, 5 V; when using USB-C see USB 3.1	127 (with a hub)
USB 2.0	480 Mbit/s	58 MB/s	5 m (Note: USB hubs can be daisy chained up to 25 m)	2.5 W, 5 V; when using USB-C see USB 3.1	127 (with a hub)
USB 1.1	12 Mbit/s	1.5 MB/s	3 m	Yes	127 (with a hub)
SCSI Ultra-320	2.56 Gbit/s	320 MB/s	12 m	Only with SCA Backplane	15 excl. host bus adapter/host
10GFC Fibre Channel	10.52 Gbit/s	1.195 GB/s	2 m – 50 km	No	126 (16,777,216 with switches)
4GFC Fibre Channel	4.25 Gbit/s	398 MB/s	12 m	No	126 (16,777,216 with switches)
InfiniBand; Quad Rate	10 Gbit/s	0.98 GB/s	5 m (copper); <10 km (fiber)	No	1 with point-to-point, many with switched fabric
Thunderbolt	10 Gbit/s	1.22 GB/s	3 m (copper); 100 m (fiber)	10 W (only copper)	7
Thunderbolt 2	20 Gbit/s	2.44 GB/s	3 m (copper); 100 m (fiber)	10 W (only copper)	7
Thunderbolt 3	40 Gbit/s	4.88 GB/s	3 m (copper); 100 m (fiber)	100 W (only copper)	7

== See also ==
- FATA (hard disk drive)
- libATA
- List of interface bit rates
