= Lindy Electronics =

- Company type: Private company
- Industry: Peripheral Consumer Electronics Computer hardware
- Founded: Germany (1932)
- Founder: Kurt Lindenberg
- Headquarters: Germany and UK
- Number of locations: 7 offices
- Products: Connectivity
- Website: Lindy.com

Lindy Electronics produces computer and audiovisual connectivity products. It sells through the distribution channel, via its own online and mail-order business and elsewhere.

== History ==
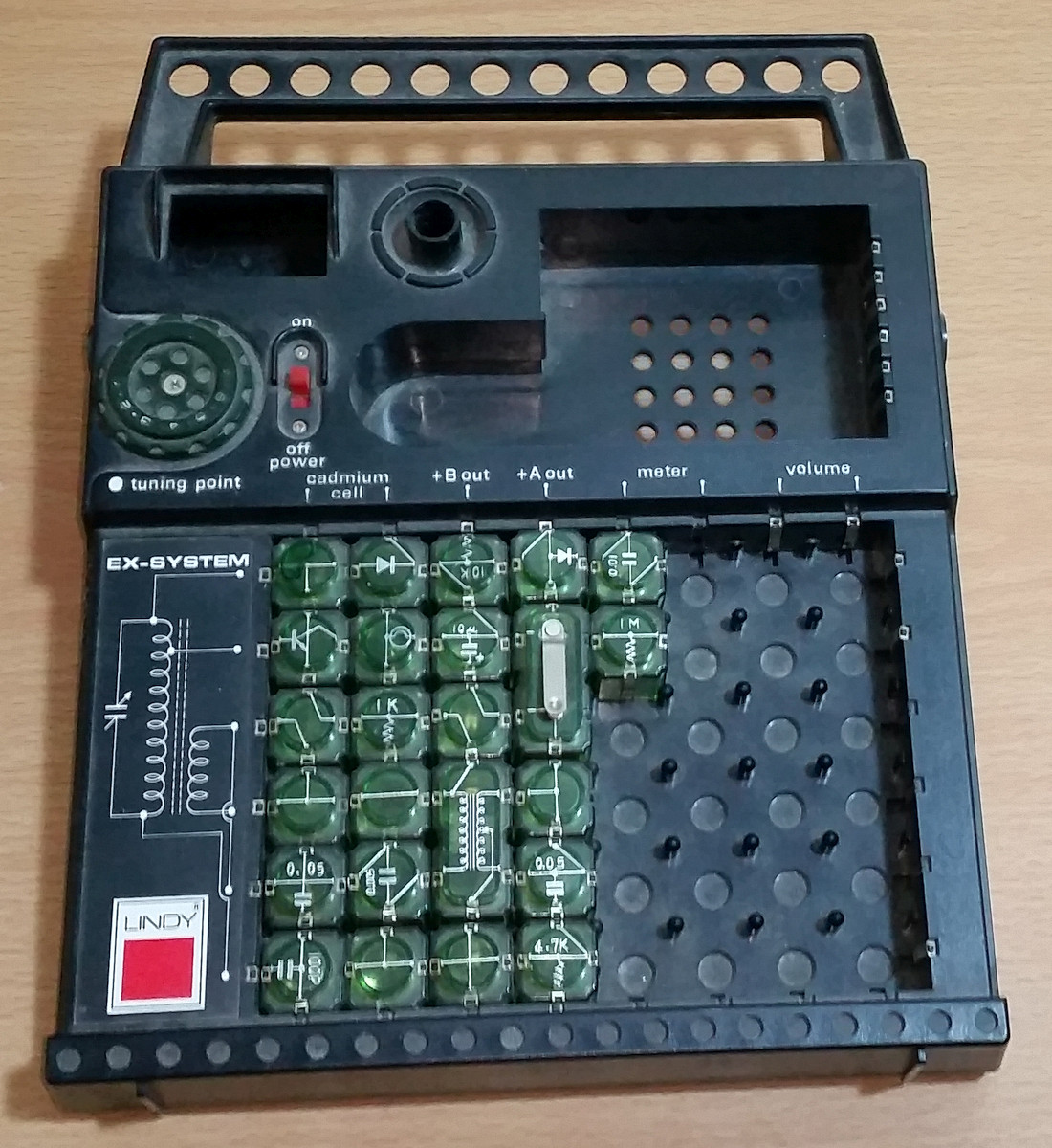
Electronic kit from Lindy (1980s)

In 1932, from a small apartment in Breslau, Germany, Kurt Lindenberg started a family business that was the beginning of the Lindy group.

He closed the business during the Second World War, but reopened it in 1947 in his new hometown of Mannheim. The business expanded from the petrol lamps and simple electrical appliances that it had sold in the early days, to follow the consumer demand for radios and televisions with the introduction of KUBA radio and TV furniture into the line.

In the 1960s the company begin to sell self-assembly radios and amplifiers from the Danish manufacturer Josty, and by 1970 Lindy sold mainly electronic components and equipment.

The Lindy logo, which is still used in similar form today, was created in the mid-1970s for the launch of a range of electronic games in conjunction with the Japanese company Gakken. Alongside these, the Lindy Electronic Station was the first product to be fully developed and designed in-house.

As the home computer market grew in the 1980s, Lindy expanded into computer connectivity equipment such as cables and KVM Switches. The next decade saw a phase of international expansion, with offices opened in the United Kingdom, France, Italy, and Switzerland.

By 2000 the Lindy branch in the United Kingdom had outgrown its premises and work began on a new office and warehouse facility in Stockton-on-Tees that later became its UK headquarters. The group also opened offices in Australia, Ireland, and the United States.
