= Serial ATA International Organization =

Computing industry organization involved with the Serial ATA specification

- Abbreviation: SATA-IO
- Predecessor: Serial ATA Working Group
- Founded: July 2004
- Type: Non-profit organization
- Legal status: Incorporated
- Purpose: Development and promotion of the Serial ATA (SATA) specification
- Region served: Worldwide
- Members: Companies in the computing and storage industries
- Leader: Granite River Labs, Intel, Marvell, Novus Labs, Seagate Technology, and Western Digital
- Parent organization: INCITS (affiliated)
- Affiliations: ANSI (through INCITS)
- Website: sata-io.org

Serial ATA International Organization (SATA-IO) is an independent, non-profit organization which provides the computing industry with guidance and support for implementing the SATA specification. SATA-IO was developed by and for leading industry companies. It was officially formed in July 2004 by incorporating the previous Serial ATA Working Group which had been established in February 2000 to specify Serial ATA for desktop applications.

SATA-IO is affiliated directly to INCITS, and indirectly via INCITS to ANSI. Many members form this organization; it is currently led by Granite River Labs, Intel, Marvell, Novus Labs, Seagate Technology, and Western Digital.

== See also ==
- SATA Express
- Serial ATA
