= Solid-state drive =

Computer storage device with no moving parts

- A 2280 NVMe SSD (Kioxia XG10 512GB)

Usage of flash memory
- Introduced by: SanDisk
- Introduction date: 1991; 35 years ago
- Capacity: 20 MB (2.5-in form factor)

Original concept
- By: Storage Technology Corporation
- Conceived: 1978; 48 years ago
- Capacity: 45 MB

As of 2026
- Capacity: Up to 512 TB

Patriot P210 1TB SATA SSD

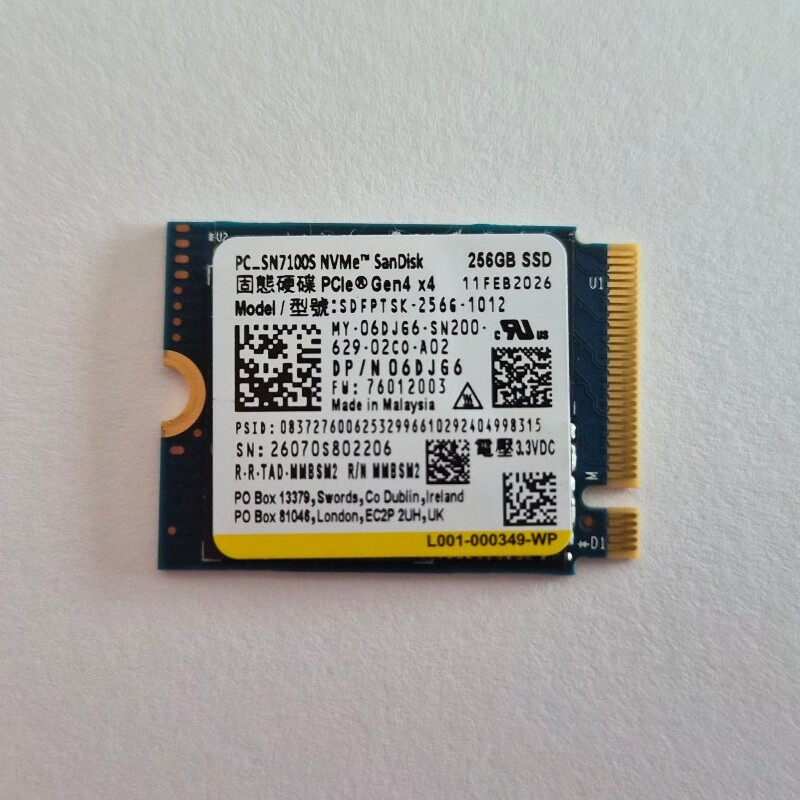
A 2230 NVMe SSD (SanDisk 256GB PC SN7100s)

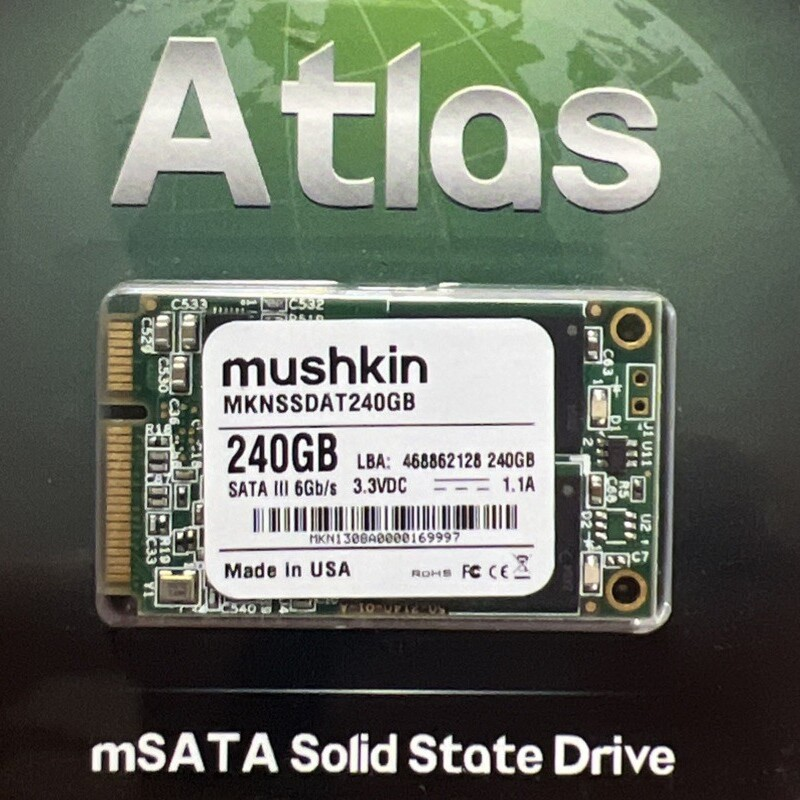
A 30x50 mSATA SSD (Mushkin Atlas 240GB)

A solid-state drive (SSD) is a type of solid-state storage device that uses integrated circuits to store data persistently. It is sometimes called semiconductor storage device, solid-state device, or solid-state disk. Etymologically, "solid-state drive" partly refers to existing data storage devices like tape drives and hard disk drives, which all use a mechanically driven storage medium.

SSDs rely on non-volatile memory, typically NAND flash, to store data in memory cells. The performance and endurance of SSDs vary depending on the number of bits stored per cell, ranging from high-performing single-level cells (SLC) to more affordable but slower quad-level cells (QLC). In addition to flash-based SSDs, other technologies such as 3D XPoint offer faster speeds and higher endurance through different data storage mechanisms.

Unlike traditional hard disk drives (HDDs), SSDs have no moving parts, allowing them to deliver faster data access speeds, reduced latency, increased resistance to physical shock, lower power consumption, and silent operation.

Often interfaced to a system in the same way as HDDs, SSDs are used in a variety of devices, including personal computers, enterprise servers, and mobile devices. However, SSDs are generally more expensive on a per-gigabyte basis and have a finite number of write cycles, which can lead to data loss over time. Despite these limitations, SSDs are increasingly replacing HDDs, especially in performance-critical applications and as primary storage in many consumer devices.

SSDs come in various form factors and interface types, including SATA, PCIe, and NVMe, each offering different levels of performance. Hybrid storage solutions, such as solid-state hybrid drives (SSHDs), combine SSD and HDD technologies to offer improved performance at a lower cost than pure SSDs.

== Attributes ==
An SSD stores data in semiconductor cells, with its properties varying according to the number of bits stored in each cell (between 1 and 4). Single-level cells (SLC) store one bit of data per cell and provide higher performance and endurance. In contrast, multi-level cells (MLC), triple-level cells (TLC), and quad-level cells (QLC) store more data per cell but have lower performance and endurance. SSDs using 3D XPoint technology, such as Intel's Optane, store data by changing electrical resistance instead of storing electrical charges in cells, which can provide faster speeds and longer data persistence compared to conventional flash memory. SSDs based on NAND flash slowly leak charge when not powered, while heavily used consumer drives may start losing data typically after one to two years unpowered in storage. SSDs have a limited lifetime number of writes, and also slow down as they reach their full storage capacity.

SSDs also have internal parallelism that allows them to manage multiple operations simultaneously, which enhances their performance.

Unlike HDDs and similar electromechanical magnetic storage, SSDs do not have moving mechanical parts, which provides advantages such as resistance to physical shock, quieter operation, and faster access times. Their lower latency results in higher input/output rates (IOPS) than HDDs.

Some SSDs are combined with traditional hard drives in hybrid configurations, such as Intel's Hystor and Apple's Fusion Drive. These drives use both flash memory and spinning magnetic disks in order to improve the performance of frequently accessed data.

Traditional interfaces (e.g. SATA and SAS) and standard HDD form factors allow such SSDs to be used as drop-in replacements for HDDs in computers and other devices. Newer form factors such as mSATA, M.2, U.2, NF1/M.3/NGFF, XFM Express (Crossover Flash Memory, form factor XT2) and EDSFF and higher speed interfaces such as NVM Express (NVMe) over PCI Express (PCIe) can further increase performance over HDD performance.

=== Comparison with other technologies ===
==== Hard disk drives ====
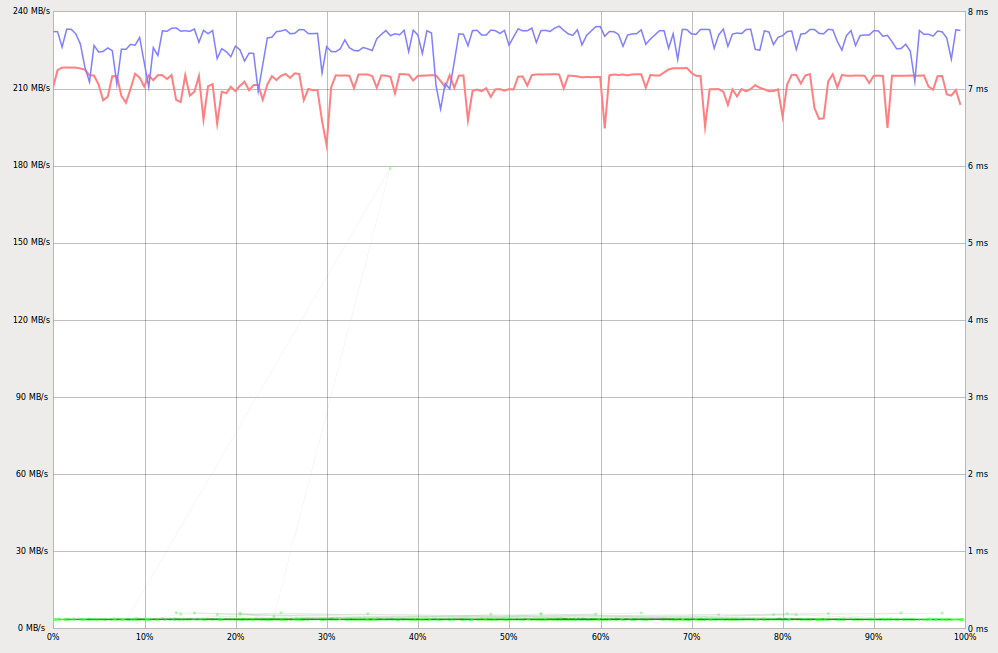
Benchmark of a 500GB SATA-2 SSD (OCZ Agility-3, circa 2011), showing about 230 MB/s reading speed (blue), 210 MB/s writing speed (red) and about 0.1 ms seek time (green), all independent from the accessed disk location. As of 2026, Gen5 SSDs can reach up to 15GB/s, a 60x improvement over this SSD.

Traditional HDD benchmarks tend to focus on the performance characteristics such as rotational latency and seek time. As SSDs do not need to spin or seek to locate data, they are vastly superior to HDDs in such tests. However, SSDs have challenges with mixed reads and writes, and their performance may degrade over time. Therefore, SSD testing typically looks at when the full drive is first used, as the new and empty drive may have much better write performance than it would show after only weeks of use.

The reliability of both HDDs and SSDs varies greatly among models. Some field failure rates indicate that SSDs are significantly more reliable than HDDs. However, SSDs are sensitive to sudden power interruption, sometimes resulting in aborted writes or even cases of the complete loss of the drive.

Most of the advantages of solid-state drives over traditional hard drives are due to their ability to access data completely electronically instead of electromechanically, resulting in superior transfer speeds and mechanical ruggedness. On the other hand, hard disk drives offer significantly higher capacity for their price.

In traditional HDDs, a rewritten file will generally occupy the same location on the disk surface as the original file, whereas in SSDs the new copy will often be written to different NAND cells for the purpose of wear leveling. The wear-leveling algorithms are complex and difficult to test exhaustively. As a result, one major cause of data loss in SSDs is firmware bugs.

Comparison of NAND-based SSD and HDD
Attribute or characteristic	Solid-state drive (SSD)	Hard disk drive (HDD)
Price per capacity	SSDs are generally more expensive than HDDs and are expected to remain so. As of late 2025, SSD prices are around $0.05-0.10 per gigabyte for 4TB and 8TB models.	HDDs, as of late 2025, are priced around $0.01 to $0.03 per gigabyte for 4TB and 8TB models.
Storage capacity	As of 2026, SSDs are available in sizes up to 512 TB, though most PCs run models ranging from 1TB to 4TB.	HDDs of up to 36 TB are available as of 2025.
Reliability – data retention	If the nominal written life of SSDs (the terabytes written) is reached, the SSDs may start losing data after three months (enterprise SSDs) or one year (consumer SSDs) without power, especially at high temperatures. Newer SSDs, depending on usage, may retain data longer. SSDs are generally not suited for long-term archival storage.	HDDs, when stored in a cool, dry environment, can retain data for longer periods without power. However, over time, mechanical parts may fail, such as the inability to spin up after prolonged storage.
Reliability – longevity	SSDs lack mechanical parts, theoretically making them more reliable than HDDs. However, SSD cells wear out after a limited number of writes. Controllers help mitigate this, allowing for many years of use under normal conditions.	HDDs have moving parts prone to mechanical wear, but the storage medium (magnetic platters) does not degrade from read/write cycles. Studies have suggested HDDs may last 9–11 years.
Start-up time	SSDs are nearly instantaneous, with no mechanical parts to prepare.	HDDs require several seconds to spin up before data can be accessed.
Sequential-access performance	As of mid-2026, Consumer SSDs can offer transfer rates between 500 MB/s (SATA Gen3) to 15000 MB/s (PCIe NVMe Gen5), depending on the model. Micron 9650 is the first Gen6 SSD and can reach 28 GB/s in sequential read speeds.	As of mid-2026, HDDs can transfer data at approximately 100 MB/s (2.5" SATA HDD) to 300 MB/s (3.5" SATA HDD). Rotational disks are generally fastest if data is located towards the outside of a platter. For optimal throughput, use the first and empty partition.
Random-access performance	SSD random access times typically range from 0.05-0.2 ms (50-200 microseconds) for consumer NAND SSDs, with NVMe drives achieving 0.05-0.1 ms and SATA SSDs around 0.5-0.6 ms.	HDD random access times range from 2.9 ms (high-end) to 12 ms (laptop HDDs).
Power consumption	High-performance SSDs use about half to a third of the power required by HDDs.	HDDs use between 2 and 5 watts for 2.5-inch drives, while high-performance 3.5-inch drives can require up to 20 watts.
Acoustic noise	SSDs have no moving parts and are silent. Some SSDs may produce a high-pitched noise during block erasure.	HDDs generate noise from spinning disks and moving heads, which can vary based on the drive's speed.
Temperature control	SSDs generally tolerate higher operating temperatures and generally do not require special cooling.	HDDs need cooling in high-temperature environments (above 35 °C (95 °F)) to avoid reliability issues.

==== Memory cards ====
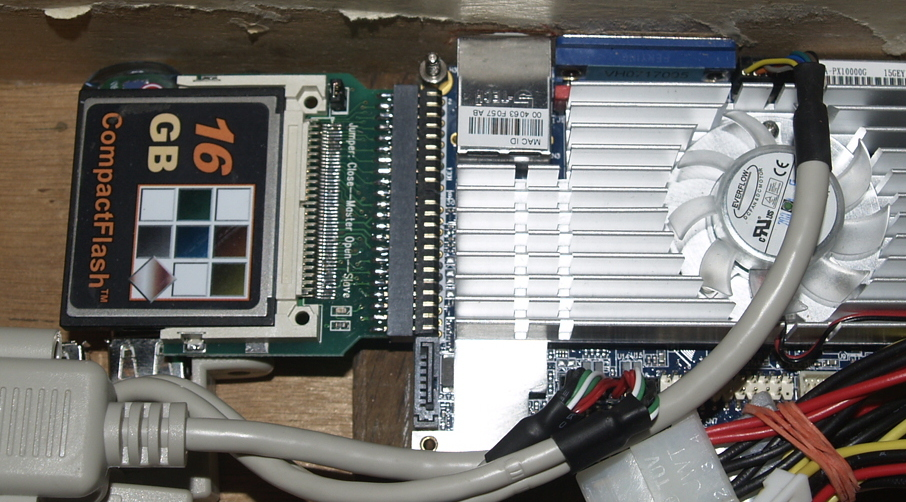
CompactFlash card used as an SSD

While both memory cards and most SSDs use flash memory, they have very different characteristics, including power consumption, performance, size, and reliability. Originally, solid state drives were shaped and mounted in the computer like hard drives. In contrast, memory cards (such as Secure Digital (SD), CompactFlash (CF), and many others) were originally designed for digital cameras and later found their way into cell phones, gaming devices, GPS units, etc. Most memory cards are physically smaller than SSDs, and designed to be inserted and removed repeatedly.

=== Failure and recovery ===
SSDs have different failure modes from traditional magnetic hard drives. Because solid-state drives contain no moving parts, they are generally not subject to mechanical failures. However, other types of failures can occur. For example, incomplete or failed writes due to sudden power loss may be more problematic than with HDDs, and the failure of a single chip may result in the loss of all data stored on it. Nonetheless, studies indicate that SSDs are generally reliable, often exceeding their manufacturer-stated lifespan and have lower failure rates than HDDs. However, studies also note that SSDs experience higher rates of uncorrectable errors, which can lead to data loss, compared to HDDs.

The endurance of an SSD is typically listed on its datasheet in one of two forms:

- either n DW/D (n drive writes per day)
- or m TBW (maximum terabytes written), abbreviated TBW. For example, a Samsung 970 EVO NVMe M.2 SSD (2018) with 1 TB of capacity has an endurance rating of 600 TBW.

The basic parameter for determining the lifespan of Flash-NAND systems is the number of programming-erase (P/E) cycles. The TBW parameter is the product of the P/E cycle resource and the SSD capacity. For an SSD with a capacity of 1 TB and TBW = 600 TB, the number of P/E cycles is 600.

Recovering data from SSDs presents challenges due to the non-linear and complex nature of data storage in solid-state drives. The internal operations of SSDs vary by manufacturer, with commands (e.g. TRIM and the ATA Secure Erase) and programs (e.g. hdparm) being able to erase and modify the bits of a deleted file.

=== Reliability metrics ===
The JEDEC Solid State Technology Association (JEDEC) has established standards for SSD reliability metrics, which include:

- Unrecoverable Bit Error Ratio (UBER)
- Terabytes Written (TBW) – the total number of terabytes that can be written to a drive within its warranty period
- Drive Writes Per Day (DWPD) – the number of times the full capacity of the drive can be written to per day within its warranty period

=== Applications ===
In a distributed computing environment, SSDs can be used as a distributed cache layer that temporarily absorbs the large volume of user requests to slower HDD-based backend storage systems. This layer provides much higher bandwidth and lower latency than the storage system would, and can be managed in a number of forms, such as a distributed key-value database and a distributed file system. On supercomputers, this layer is typically referred to as burst buffer.

Flash-based solid-state drives can be used to create network appliances from general-purpose personal computer hardware. A write protected flash drive containing the operating system and application software can substitute for larger, less reliable disk drives or CD-ROMs. Appliances built this way can provide an inexpensive alternative to expensive router and firewall hardware.

SSDs based on an SD card with a live SD operating system are easily write-locked. Combined with a cloud computing environment or other writable medium, an OS booted from a write-locked SD card is reliable, persistent and impervious to permanent corruption.

=== Hard-drive cache ===
In 2011, Intel introduced a caching mechanism for their Z68 chipset (and mobile derivatives) called Smart Response Technology, which allows a SATA SSD to be used as a cache (configurable as write-through or write-back) for a conventional, magnetic hard disk drive. A similar technology is available on HighPoint's RocketHybrid PCIe card.

Solid-state hybrid drives (SSHDs) are based on the same principle, but integrate some amount of flash memory on board of a conventional drive instead of using a separate SSD. The flash layer in these drives can be accessed independently from the magnetic storage by the host using ATA-8 commands, allowing the operating system to manage it. For example, Microsoft's ReadyDrive technology explicitly stores portions of the hibernation file in the cache of these drives when the system hibernates, making the subsequent resume faster.

Dual-drive hybrid systems are combining the usage of separate SSD and HDD devices installed in the same computer, with overall performance optimization managed by the computer user, or by the computer's operating system software. Examples of this type of system are bcache and dm-cache on Linux, and Apple's Fusion Drive.

== Architecture and function ==
The primary components of an SSD are the controller and the memory used to store data. Traditionally, early SSDs used volatile DRAM for storage, but since 2009, most SSDs utilize non-volatile NAND flash memory, which retains data even when powered off. Flash memory SSDs store data in metal–oxide–semiconductor (MOS) integrated circuit chips, using non-volatile floating-gate memory cells.

=== Controller ===
Every SSD includes a controller, which manages the data flow between the NAND memory and the host computer. The controller is an embedded processor that runs firmware to optimize performance, managing data, and ensuring data integrity.

Some of the primary functions performed by the controller are:

- Bad block mapping
- Read and write caching
- Encryption
- Crypto-shredding
- Error detection and correction using error-correcting code (ECC), such as BCH code
- Garbage collection
- Read scrubbing and management of read disturb
- Wear leveling
- Management of flash memory refresh and data retention
- Thermal detection and management

The overall performance of an SSD can scale with the number of parallel NAND chips and the efficiency of the controller. For example, controllers that enable parallel processing of NAND flash chips can improve bandwidth and reduce latency. The number of flash memory channel increases, the delay of raw flash memory (such as ONFI based NAND flash) decreases, and the bandwidth of raw flash memory increases.

Micron and Intel pioneered faster SSDs by implementing techniques such as data striping and interleaving to enhance read/write speeds. More recently, SandForce introduced controllers that incorporate data compression to reduce the amount of data written to the flash memory, potentially increasing both performance and endurance.

==== Wear leveling ====
Wear leveling is a technique used in SSDs to ensure that write and erase operations are distributed evenly across all blocks of the flash memory. Without this, specific blocks could wear out prematurely due to repeated use, reducing the overall lifespan of the SSD. The process moves data that is infrequently changed (cold data) from heavily used blocks, so that data that changes more frequently (hot data) can be written to those blocks. This helps distribute wear more evenly across the entire SSD. However, this process introduces additional writes, known as write amplification, which must be managed to balance performance and durability.

=== Memory ===
==== Flash memory ====
Comparison of architectures
Comparison characteristics	MLC : SLC	NAND : NOR
Persistence ratio	1 : 10	1 : 10
Sequential write ratio	1 : 3	1 : 4
Sequential read ratio	1 : 1	1 : 5
Price ratio	1 : 1.3	

Most SSDs use non-volatile NAND flash memory for data storage, primarily due to its cost-effectiveness and ability to retain data without a constant power supply. NAND flash-based SSDs store data in semiconductor cells, with the specific architecture influencing performance, endurance, and cost.

There are various types of NAND flash memory, categorized by the number of bits stored in each cell:

- Single-Level Cell (SLC): Stores 1 bit per cell. SLC provides the highest performance, reliability, and endurance but is more expensive.
- Multi-Level Cell (MLC): Stores 2 bits per cell. MLC offers a balance between cost, performance, and endurance.
- Triple-Level Cell (TLC): Stores 3 bits per cell. TLC is less expensive but slower and less durable than SLC and MLC.
- Quad-Level Cell (QLC): Stores 4 bits per cell. QLC is the most affordable option but has the lowest performance and endurance.

Over time, SSD controllers have improved the efficiency of NAND flash, incorporating techniques such as interleaved memory, advanced error correction, and wear leveling to optimize performance and extend the lifespan of the drive. Lower-end SSDs often use QLC or TLC memory, while higher-end drives for enterprise or performance-critical applications may use MLC or SLC.

In addition to the flat (planar) NAND structure, many SSDs now use 3D NAND (or V-NAND), where memory cells are stacked vertically, increasing storage density while improving performance and reducing costs.

==== DRAM and DIMM ====
Some SSDs use volatile DRAM instead of NAND flash, offering very high-speed data access but requiring a constant power supply to retain data. DRAM-based SSDs are typically used in specialized applications where performance is prioritized over cost or non-volatility. Many SSDs, such as NVDIMM devices, are equipped with backup power sources such as internal batteries or external AC/DC adapters. These power sources ensure data is transferred to a backup system (usually NAND flash or another storage medium) in the event of power loss, preventing data corruption or loss. Similarly, ULLtraDIMM devices use components designed for DIMM modules, but only use flash memory, similar to a DRAM SSD.

DRAM-based SSDs are often used for tasks where data must be accessed at high speeds with low latency, such as in high-performance computing or certain server environments.

==== 3D XPoint ====
3D XPoint is a type of non-volatile memory technology developed by Intel and Micron, announced in 2015. It operates by changing the electrical resistance of materials in its cells, offering much faster access times than NAND flash. 3D XPoint-based SSDs, such as Intel's Optane drives, provide lower latency and higher endurance than NAND-based drives, although they are more expensive per gigabyte.

==== Other ====
Drives known as hybrid drives or solid-state hybrid drives (SSHDs) use a hybrid of spinning disks and flash memory. Some SSDs use magnetoresistive random-access memory (MRAM) for storing data.

=== Cache and buffer ===
Many flash-based SSDs include a small amount of volatile DRAM as a cache, similar to the buffers in hard disk drives. This cache can temporarily hold data while it is being written to the flash memory, and it also stores metadata such as the mapping of logical blocks to physical locations on the SSD. This cache may also temporarily hold data while it being recently read from the flash memory.

Some SSD controllers, like those from SandForce, achieve high performance without using an external DRAM cache. These designs rely on other mechanisms, such as on-chip SRAM, to manage data and minimize power consumption.

Additionally, some SSDs use an SLC buffer mechanism to temporarily store data in single-level cell (SLC) mode, even on multi-level cell (MLC) or triple-level cell (TLC) SSDs. This improves write performance by allowing data to be written to faster SLC storage before being moved to slower, higher-capacity MLC or TLC storage.

On NVMe SSDs, Host Memory Buffer (HMB) technology allows the SSD to use a portion of the system's DRAM instead of relying on a built-in DRAM cache, reducing costs while maintaining a high level of read performance. In practice, on consumer SSDs with HMB, the HMB is mainly used for cache the file table mappings, because HMB lacks power loss protection (PLP) mechanism.

In value consumer SSDs, DRAM are mainly used for cache the file table mappings. In certain high-end consumer and enterprise SSDs, larger amounts of DRAM are included to cache the file table mappings and buffer the written data, reducing write amplification and enhances overall performance.

=== Battery and supercapacitor ===
Higher-performing SSDs may include capacitors, supercapacitors or batteries, which helps preserve data integrity in the event of an unexpected power loss. The capacitor or battery provides enough power to allow the data in the cache to be written to the non-volatile memory, ensuring no data is lost.

In some SSDs that use multi-level cell (MLC) flash memory, a potential issue known as "lower page corruption" can occur if power is lost while programming an upper page. This can result in previously written data becoming corrupted. To address this, some high-end SSDs incorporate supercapacitors to ensure all data can be safely written during a sudden power loss.

Some consumer SSDs have built-in capacitors to save critical data such as the Flash Translation Layer (FTL) mapping table. Examples include the Crucial M500 and Intel 320 series. Enterprise-class SSDs, such as the Intel DC S3700 series, often come with more robust power-loss protection mechanisms like supercapacitors or batteries.

=== Host Interface ===
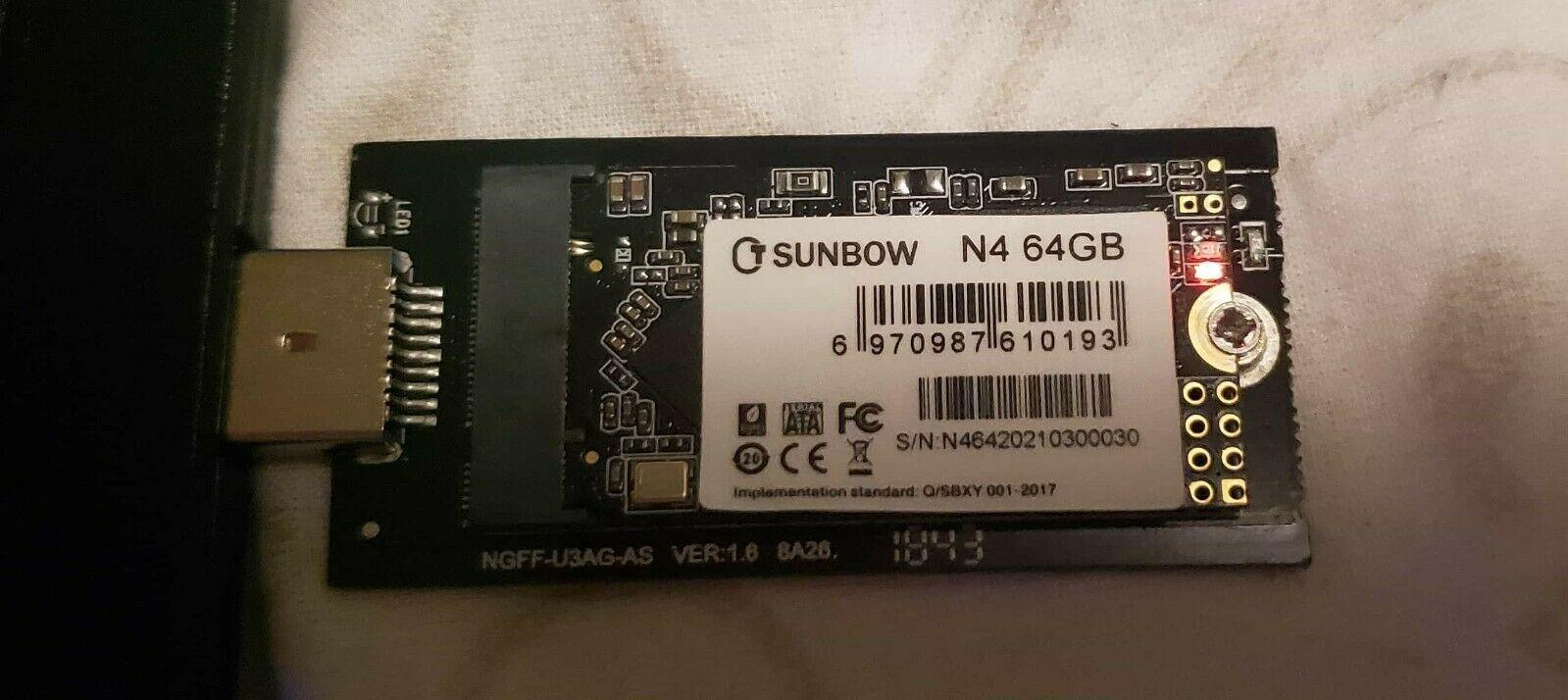
An M.2 SATA (2242) solid-state-drive (SSD) connected into USB 3.0 adapter and connected to computer

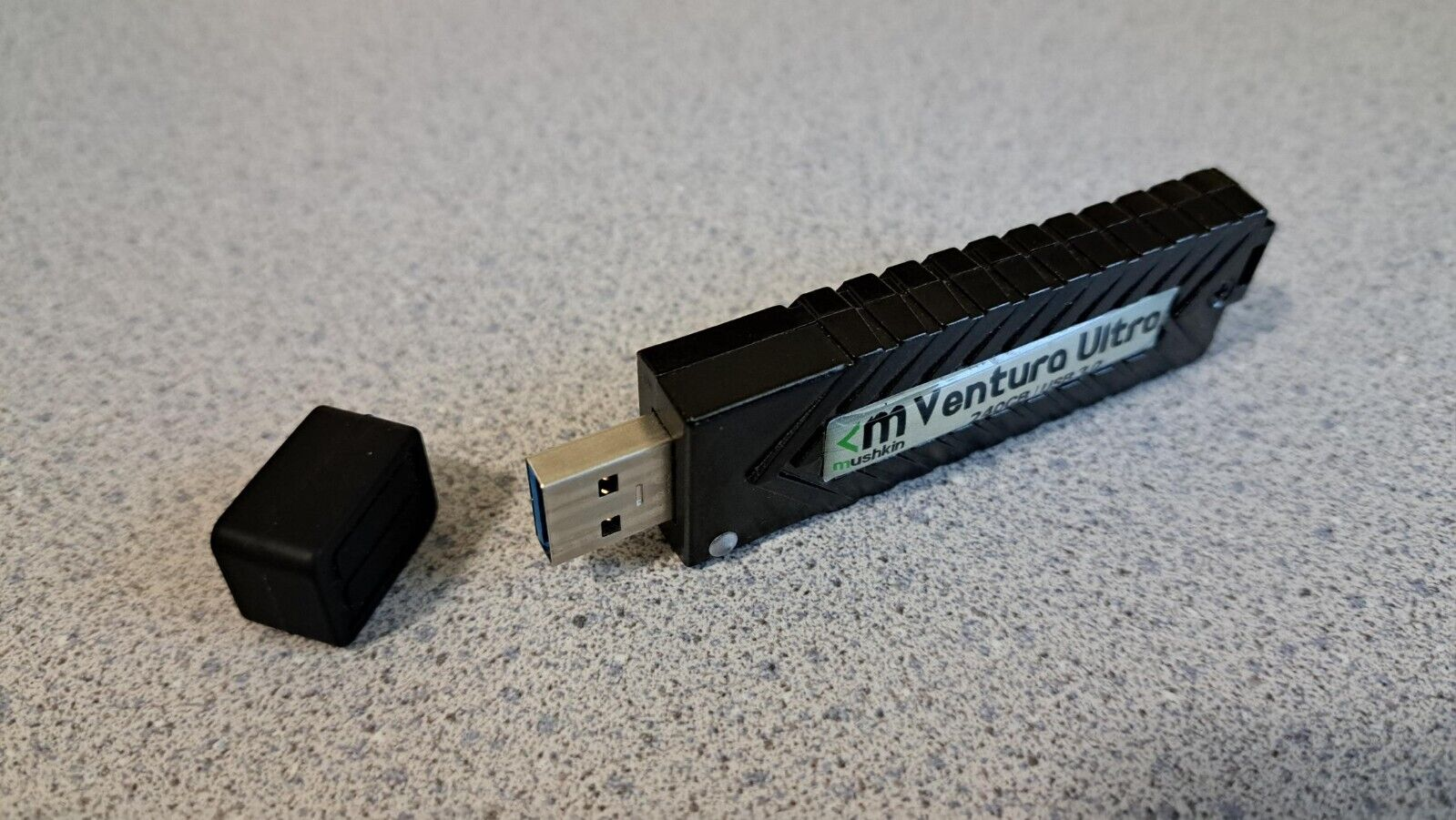
Mushkin Ventura, A USB that has an SSD inside

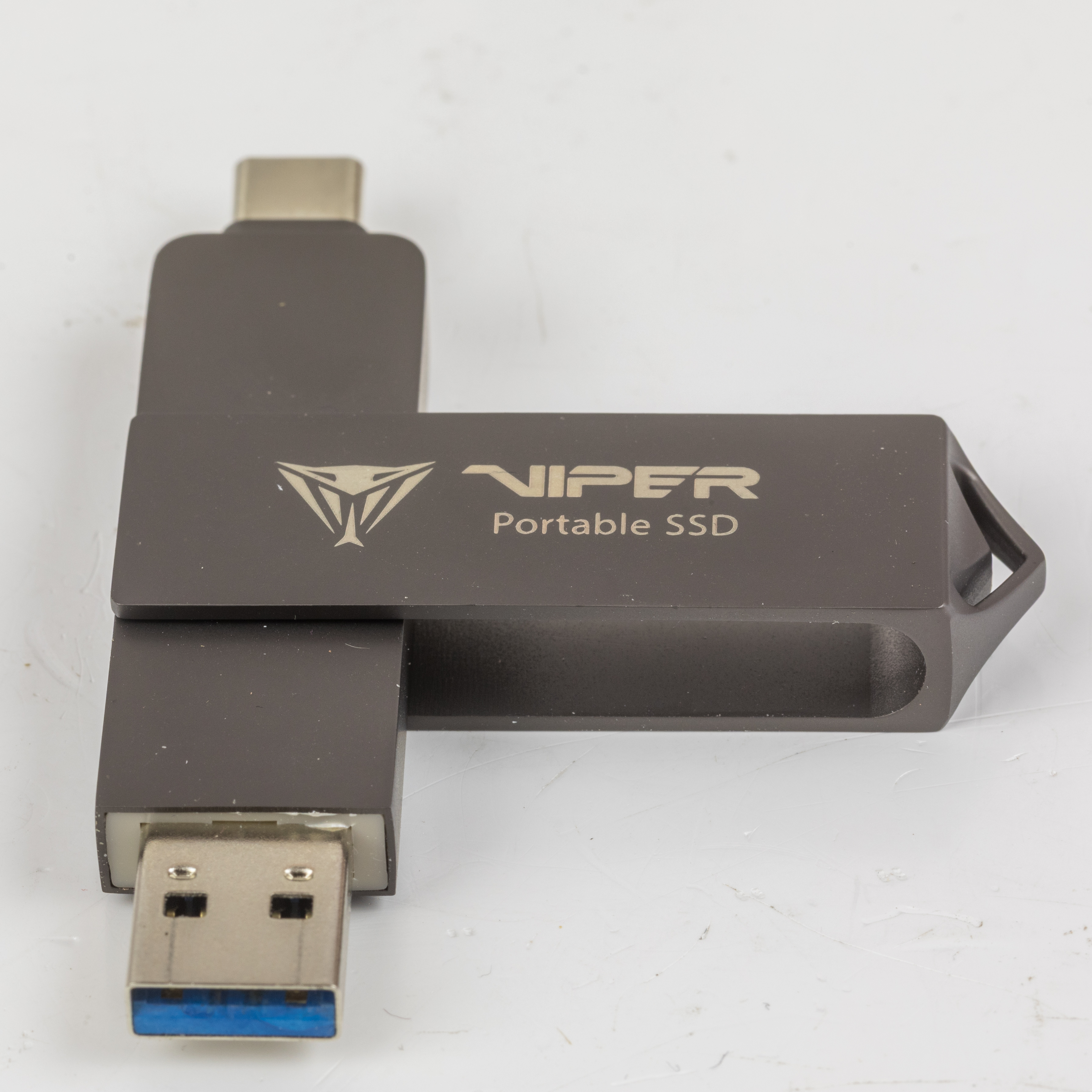
Portable SSD with connectors USB-A (front) and USB-C (back), specification 3.2 Gen 2 with data transfer rate 10 Gbit/s, capacity 2 Terabyte

The host interface of an SSD refers to the physical connector and the signaling methods used to communicate between the SSD and the host system. This interface is managed by the SSD's controller and is often similar to those found in traditional hard disk drives (HDDs). Common interfaces include:

- Serial ATA: One of the most widely used interfaces in consumer SSDs. SATA 3.0 supports transfer speeds up to 6.0 Gbit/s.
- Serial attached SCSI: Primarily used in enterprise environments, SAS interfaces are faster and more robust than SATA. SAS 3.0 offers speeds of up to 12.0 Gbit/s.
- PCI Express (PCIe): A high-speed interface used in high-performance SSDs. PCIe 3.0 x4 supports transfer speeds of up to 31.5 Gbit/s.
- M.2: A newer interface designed for SSDs that is more compact than SATA or PCIe, often found in laptops and desktops. M.2 supports both SATA (up to 6.0 Gbit/s) and PCIe interfaces.
- U.2: Another interface used for enterprise-grade SSDs, providing PCIe x4 lanes but with a more robust connector suitable for server environments.
- Fibre Channel: Typically used in enterprise systems, Fibre Channel interfaces offer high data transfer speeds, with modern versions supporting up to 128 Gbit/s.
- USB: Many external SSDs use the Universal Serial Bus interface, with modern versions like USB 3.1 Gen 2 supporting speeds of up to 10 Gbit/s.
- Thunderbolt: Some high-end external SSDs use the Thunderbolt interface.
- Parallel ATA (PATA): An older interface used in early SSDs, with speeds up to 1064 Mbit/s. PATA has largely been replaced by SATA due to higher data transfer rates and greater reliability.
- Parallel SCSI: An interface primarily used in servers, with speeds ranging from 40 Mbit/s to 2560 Mbit/s. It has mostly been replaced by Serial Attached SCSI. The last SCSI-based SSD was introduced in 2004.

SSDs may support various logical interfaces, which define the command sets used by operating systems to communicate with the SSD. Two common logical interfaces include:

- Advanced Host Controller Interface (AHCI): Initially designed for HDDs, AHCI is commonly used with SATA SSDs but is less efficient for modern SSDs due to its overhead.
- NVM Express (NVMe): A modern interface designed specifically for SSDs, NVMe takes full advantage of the parallelism in SSDs, providing significantly lower latency and higher throughput than AHCI.

== Configurations ==
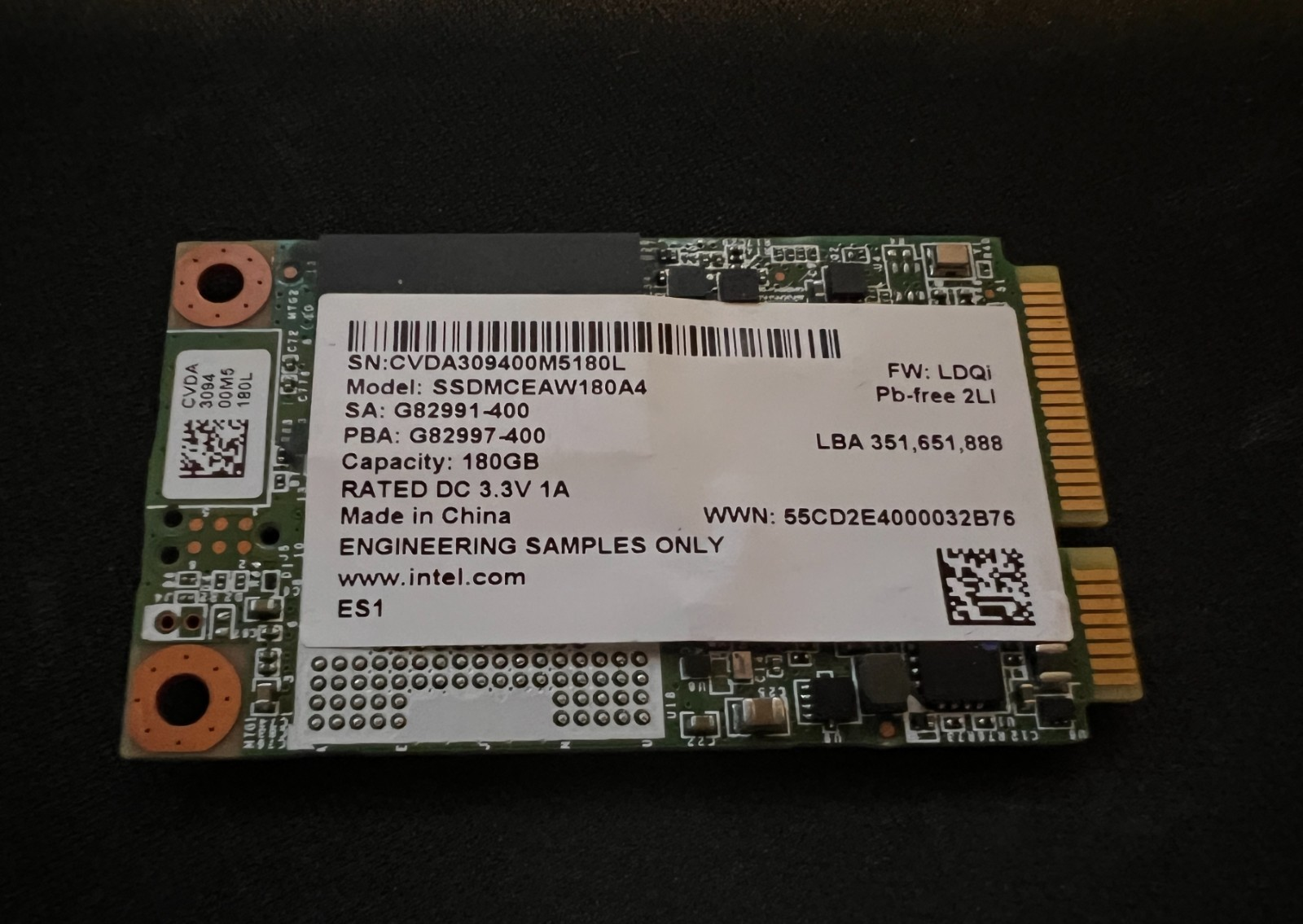
Intel 525 mSATA SSD

The size and shape of any device are largely driven by the size and shape of the components used to make that device. Traditional HDDs and optical drives are designed around the rotating platter(s) or optical disc along with the spindle motor inside. Since an SSD is made up of various interconnected integrated circuits (ICs) and an interface connector, its shape is no longer limited to the shape of rotating media drives. The lack of moving parts and light weight meant that an SSD can have no shell and simply appear in the shape of a plug-in board. On the other end of the size spectrum, some solid-state storage solutions come in a larger chassis that may even be a rack-mount form factor with numerous SSDs inside. They would all connect to a common bus inside the chassis and connect outside the box with a single connector.

For general computer use, the 2.5-inch form factor (typically found in laptops and used for most SATA SSDs) was the most popular in the 2010s, in three thicknesses (7.0mm, 9.5mm, 14.8 or 15.0mm; with 12.0mm also available for some models). For desktop computers with 3.5-inch hard disk drive slots, a simple adapter plate can be used to make such a drive fit. Other types of form factors are more common in enterprise applications. An SSD can also be completely integrated in the other circuitry of the device, as in the Apple MacBook Air (starting with the fall 2010 model). As of 2014, mSATA and M.2 form factors also gained popularity, primarily in laptops.

=== Standard HDD form factors ===
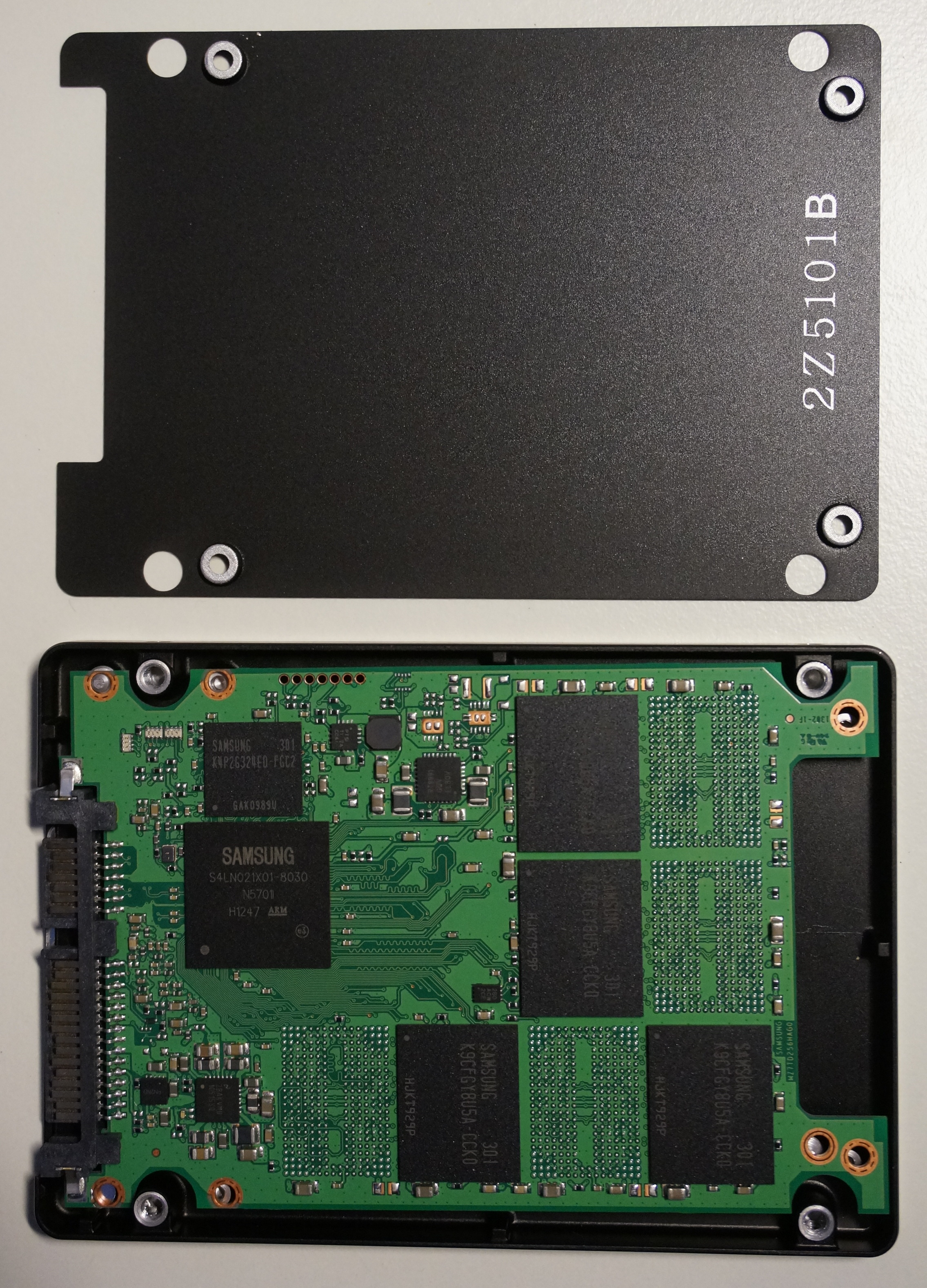
An SSD with a 2.5-inch HDD form factor. The SSD is opened to show what is inside. It contains the controller, DRAM memory, and four NAND flash. Each NAND is 32GB.

The benefit of using a current HDD form factor would be to take advantage of the extensive infrastructure already in place to mount and connect the drives to the host system. These traditional form factors are known by the size of the rotating media (i.e., 5.25-inch, 3.5-inch, 2.5-inch or 1.8-inch) and not the dimensions of the drive casing.

==== Disk-on-a-module form factors ====
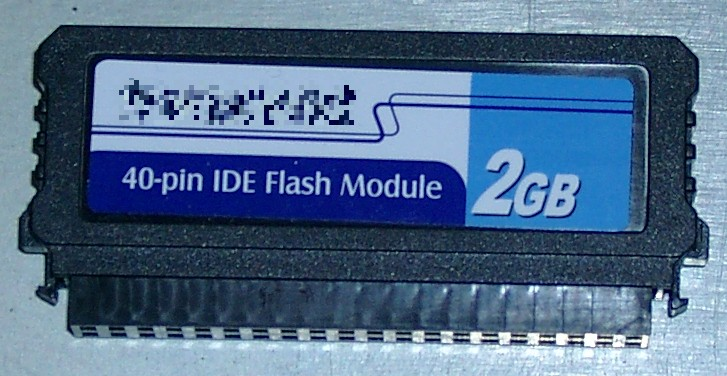
A 2 GB disk-on-a-module with PATA interface

A disk-on-a-module (DOM) is a flash drive with either 40/44-pin Parallel ATA (PATA) or SATA interface, intended to be plugged directly into the motherboard and used as a computer hard disk drive (HDD). DOM devices emulate a traditional hard disk drive, resulting in no need for special drivers or other specific operating system support. DOMs are usually used in embedded systems, which are often deployed in harsh environments where mechanical HDDs would simply fail, or in thin clients because of small size, low power consumption, and silent operation.

SATA DOMs come in several forms. The most traditional emulates the standard interface, with the 7-pin SATA data connector placed beside the 15-pin SATA power connector. An example is the "half-slim SATA" MO-297 size standard. To save board space, smaller SATA DOMs were made that only use the SATA data connector. The earliest type, made by e.g. Supermicro, relied on a separate Berg connector to deliver power. A second type of 2012, made by Innodisk, repurposes the 7th pin of the connector from GND to VCC (+5V). A third type called "pin 8 power" replaces the two plastic structural elements on the sides with two metal contacts for GND and VCC. These new types of SATADOMs are now so popular that the older 7+15-pin type is virtually not considered to be "SATADOMs" any more, especially as few motherboards provide such an interface. (PATA DOMs have no power concern as the connector supplies 3.3V or 5V power: the same way a CompactFlash would get its power.)

There are also USB DOMs designed to be plugging into the USB 2.0 header pins on a motherboard.

As of 2016, DOM storage capacities range from 4 MB to 128 GB with different variations in physical layouts, including vertical or horizontal orientation.

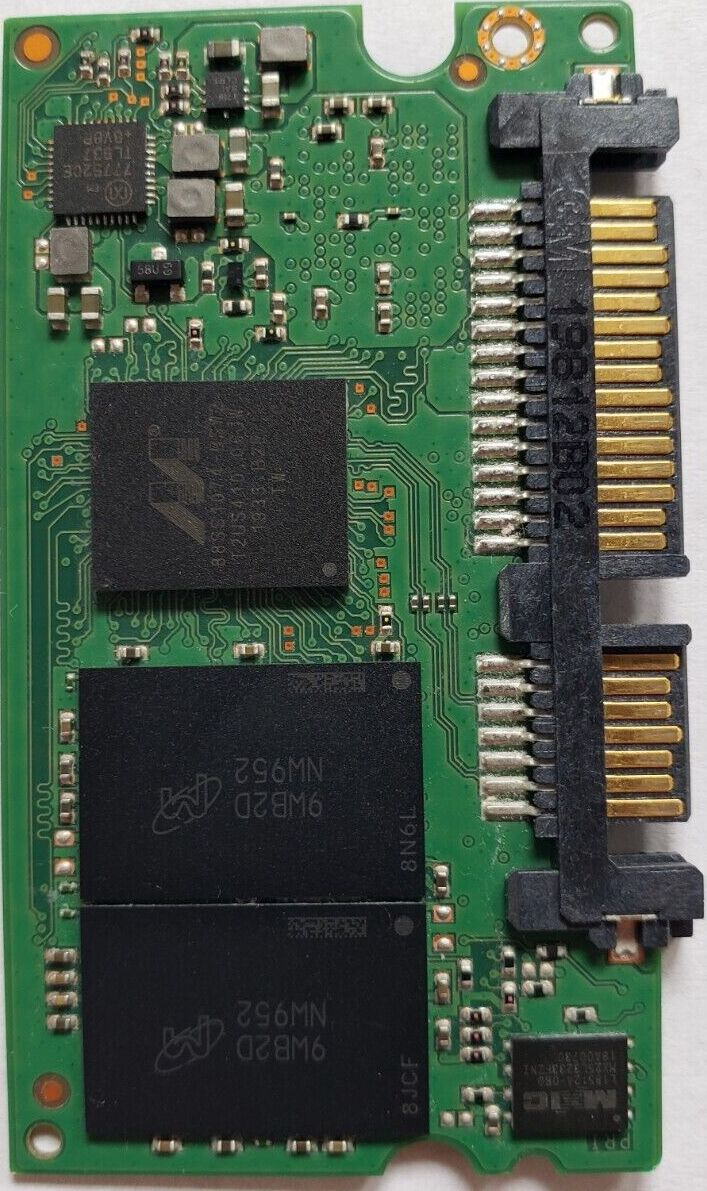
512 GB SSD with 7+15-pin SATA interface

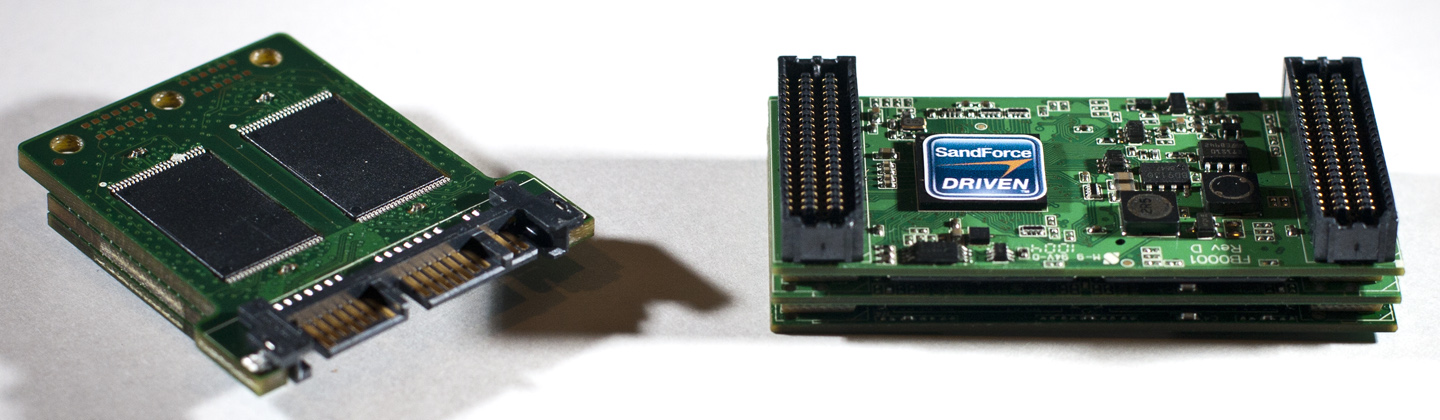
Viking Technology SATA (7+15) Cube and AMP SATA Bridge multi-layer SSDs; the one on the left uses the standard 7+15-pin interface

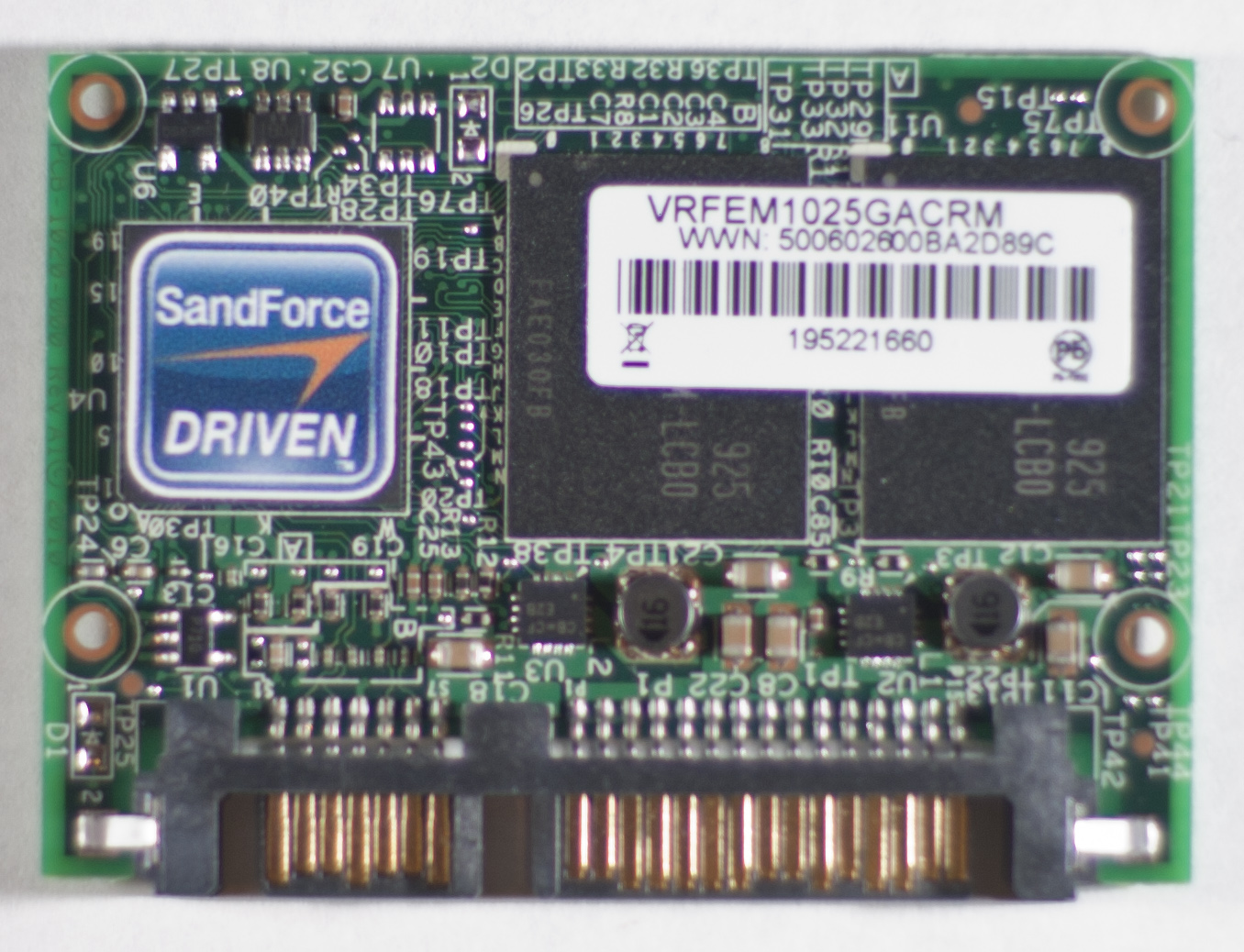
MO-297 SATA (7+15) drive-on-a-module (DOM) SSD form factor

=== Standard small card form factors ===
A Marvel 1TB 2230 NVMe SSD made in 2024 (with a MArvell controller). Because of its M.2 2230 form factor, this SSD uses a smaller controller chip with only one NAND memory chip without any DRAM cache. Instead, it uses HMB (Host Memory Buffering) as a pseudo-cache, and a pseudo-SLC cache for burst sequential writes.

A Toshiba (now Kioxia) 256GB mSATA SSD made in 2012 (with a SandForce controller). MSATA was commonly used in older devices before M.2 and NVMe got introduced. It had fewer NAND memories compared to 2.5" SSDs, which often lead to slower speed compared to their 2.5" form factor counterparts.

For applications where space is at a premium, like for ultrabooks or tablet computers, a few compact form factors were standardized for flash-based SSDs.

There is the mSATA form factor, which uses the PCI Express Mini Card physical layout. It remains electrically compatible with the PCI Express Mini Card interface specification while requiring an additional connection to the SATA host controller through the same connector. A higher-performance SSD may use the Mini-PCIe to access the PCIe bus directly.

M.2 form factor, formerly known as the Next Generation Form Factor (NGFF), is a natural transition from the mSATA and physical layout it used, to a more usable and more advanced form factor. While mSATA took advantage of an existing form factor and connector, M.2 has been designed to maximize usage of the card space, while minimizing the footprint. The M.2 standard allows both SATA and PCI Express SSDs to be fitted onto M.2 modules.

=== Add-in-card form factors ===
Before M.2 was standardized, one of the main ways to access the PCIe bus for faster-than-SATA/SAS speed on a server was through the PCIe slot. A common shape is called HHHL (Half Height Half Length), or AIC (Add in Card) SSDs.

Some primitive PCIe SSDs do not access the PCIe bus directly, but simply had a PCIe-to-SATA/SAS bridge device and a number of SATA or SAS flash controllers attached. This was considered acceptable in 2010, when true PCIe SSDs were still new.

This shape remains in use for some high performance, high capacity drives. The PCIe slot offers 16 lanes of data and 75 watts of power, still much larger than what a M.2 slot can provide. It also provides space for a large heat sink. There are also adapter boards that converts other form factors, especially M.2 drives with PCIe interface, into regular add-in cards.

=== Ball grid array form factors ===
In the early 2000s, a few companies introduced SSDs in Ball Grid Array (BGA) form factors, such as M-Systems' (now SanDisk) DiskOnChip and Silicon Storage Technology's NANDrive (now produced by Greenliant Systems), and Memoright's M1000 for use in embedded systems. The main benefits of BGA SSDs are their low power consumption, small chip package size to fit into compact subsystems, and that they can be soldered directly onto a system motherboard to reduce adverse effects from vibration and shock.

Such embedded drives now often adhere to the eMMC and eUFS standards.

=== Form factors with nonstandard connectors ===
==== Box ====
Many of the DRAM-based solutions in 2014 use a box that is often designed to fit in a rack-mount system. The number of DRAM components required to get sufficient capacity to store the data along with the backup power supplies requires a larger space than traditional HDD form factors.

==== Board/card ====
The flexibility of the SSD also allows for many unusual form factors, some of which had been important in its early adoption in PCs. For example, the SATADIMM from Viking Technology uses an empty DDR3 DIMM slot on the motherboard to provide power to the SSD with a separate SATA connector to provide the data connection back to the computer. The result is an easy-to-install SSD with a capacity equal to drives that typically take a full 2.5-inch drive bay.

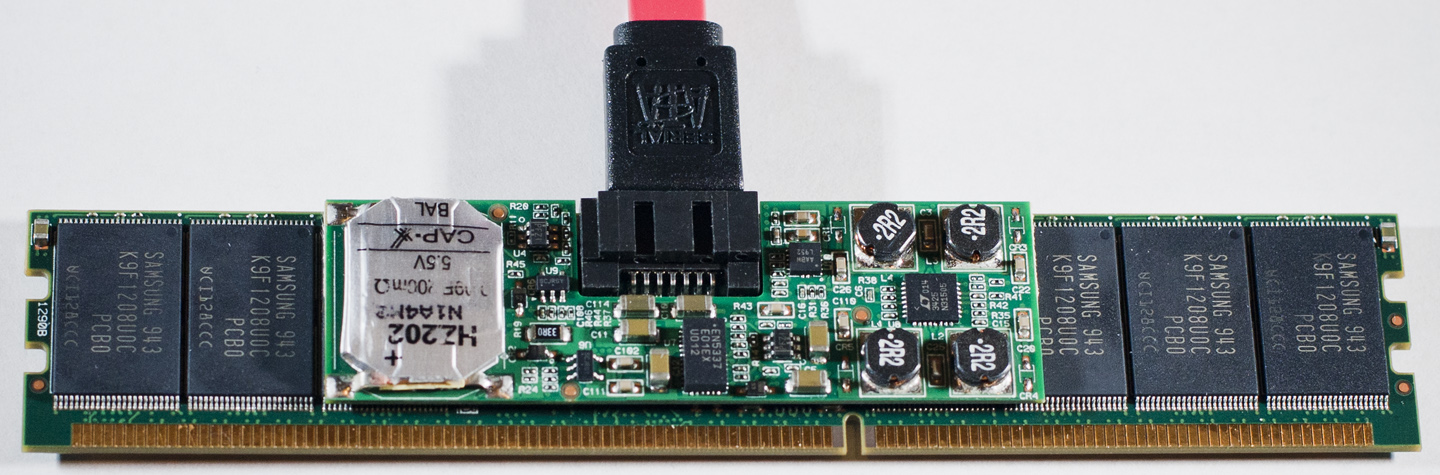
Viking Technology SATADIMM based SSD

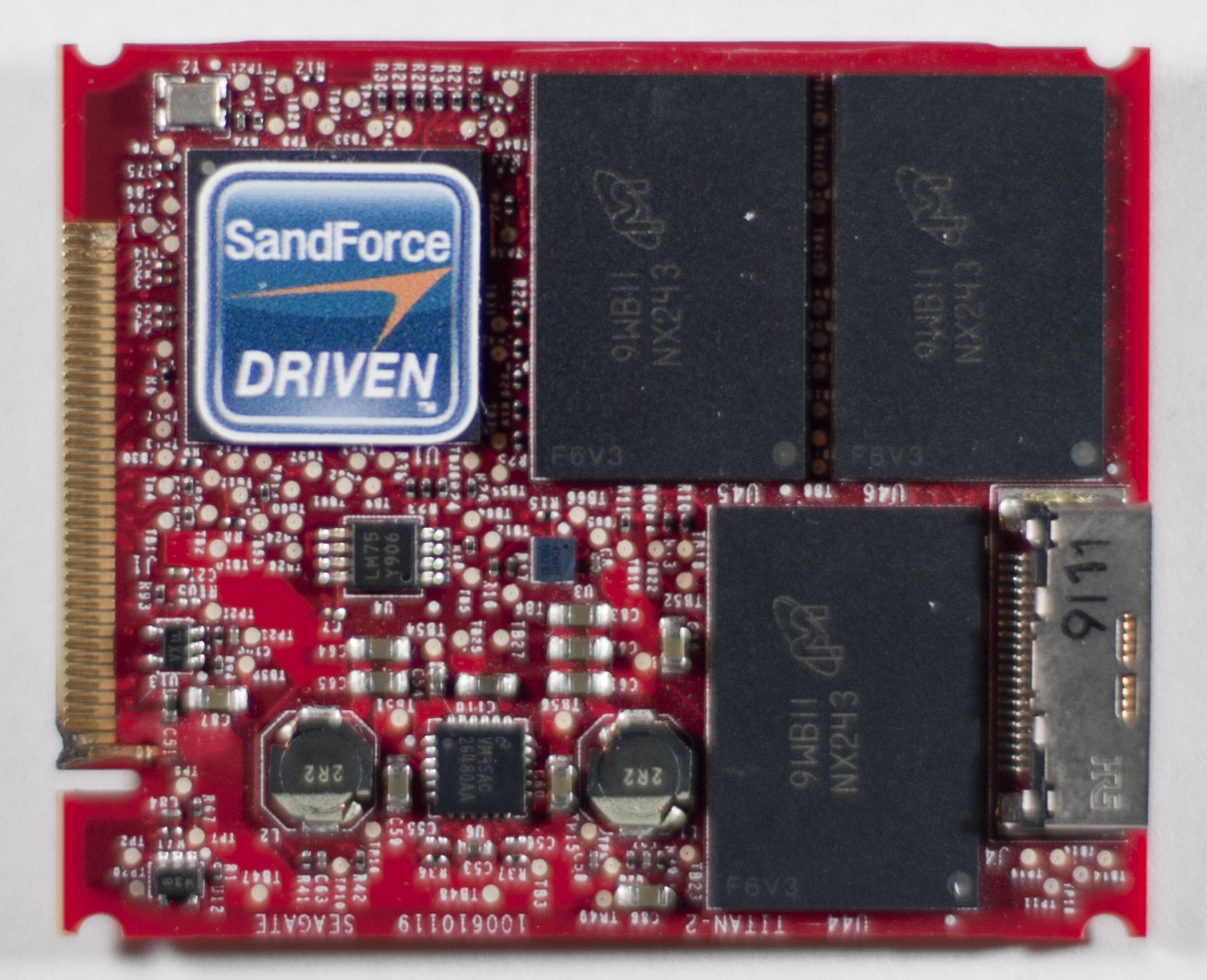
A custom-connector SATA SSD

== Development and history ==
Historical lowest retail prices of computer memory and storage

=== Early SSDs using RAM and similar technology ===
The first devices resembling solid-state drives (SSDs) used semiconductor technology, with an early example being the 1978 StorageTek STC 4305. This device was a plug-compatible replacement for the IBM 2305 hard drive, initially using charge-coupled devices for storage and later switching to dynamic random-access memory (DRAM). The STC 4305 was significantly faster than its mechanical counterparts and cost around $400,000 for a 45 MB capacity. Though early SSD-like devices existed, they were not widely used due to their high cost and small storage capacity.

In the late 1980s, companies like Zitel began selling DRAM-based SSD products under the name "RAMDisk". These devices were primarily used in specialized systems like those made by UNIVAC and Perkin-Elmer.

=== SSDs using Flash ===
SSD evolution
Parameter	Started with	Developed to	Improvement
Capacity	20 MB	100 TB	5,000,000×
Sequential read speed	49.3 MB/s	15 GB/s	304.26×
Sequential write speed	80 MB/s	15.200 GB/s	190×
IOPS	79	2,500,000	31645.57×
Access time	0.5 ms	0.045 ms read, 0.013 ms write	Read: 11×, Write: 38×
Price	US$50,000 per gigabyte	US$0.05 per gigabyte	10,000,000×

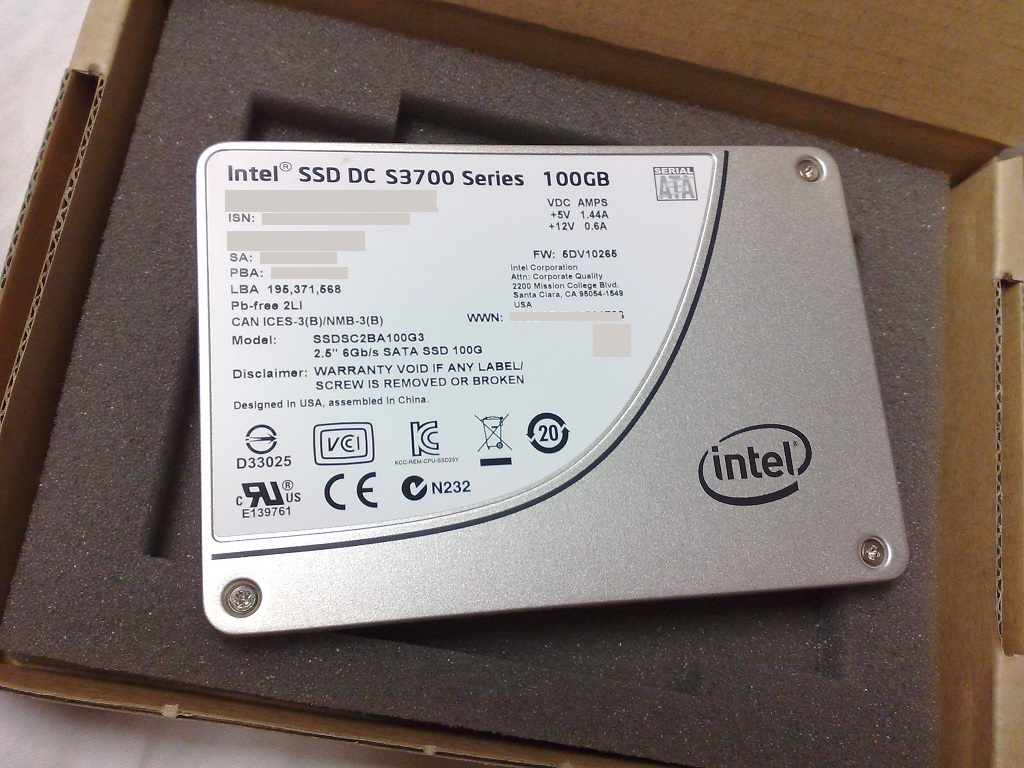
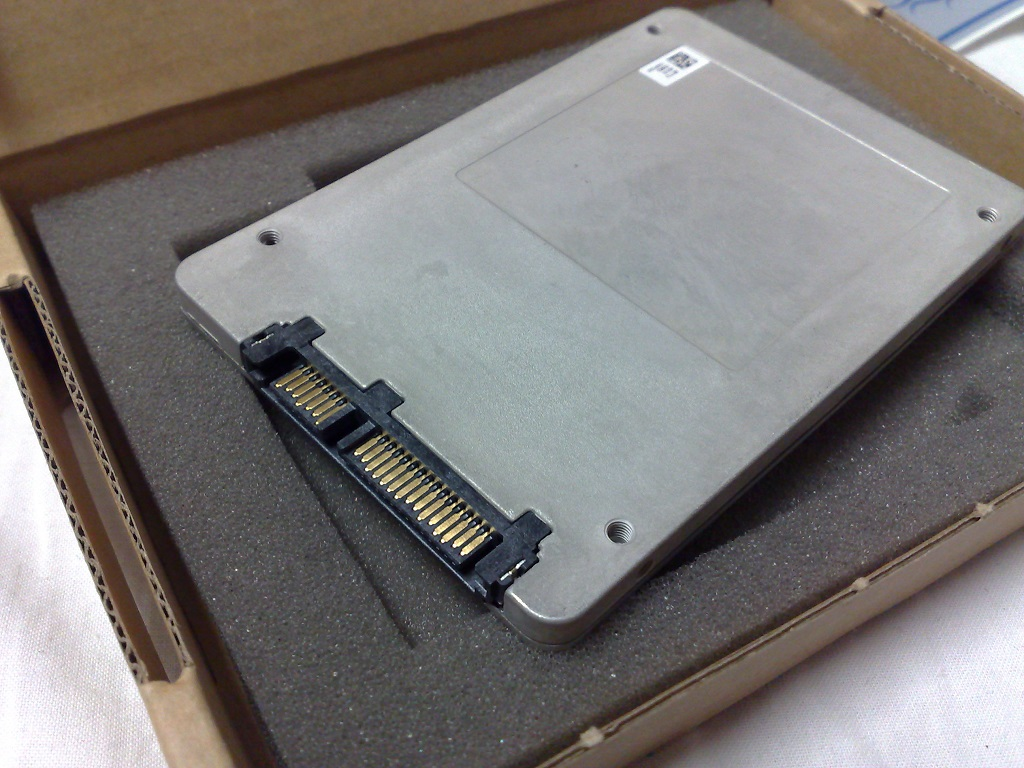
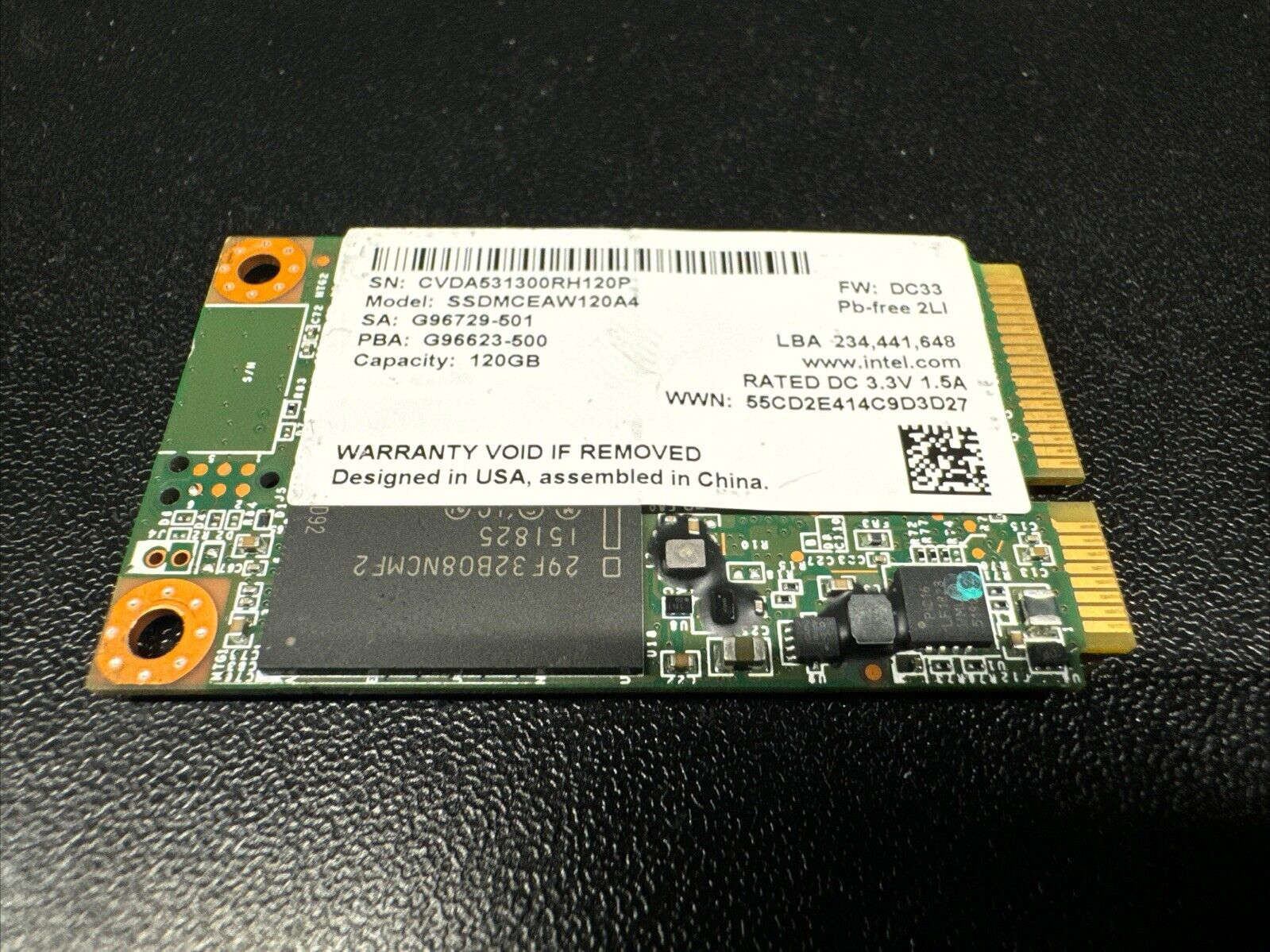
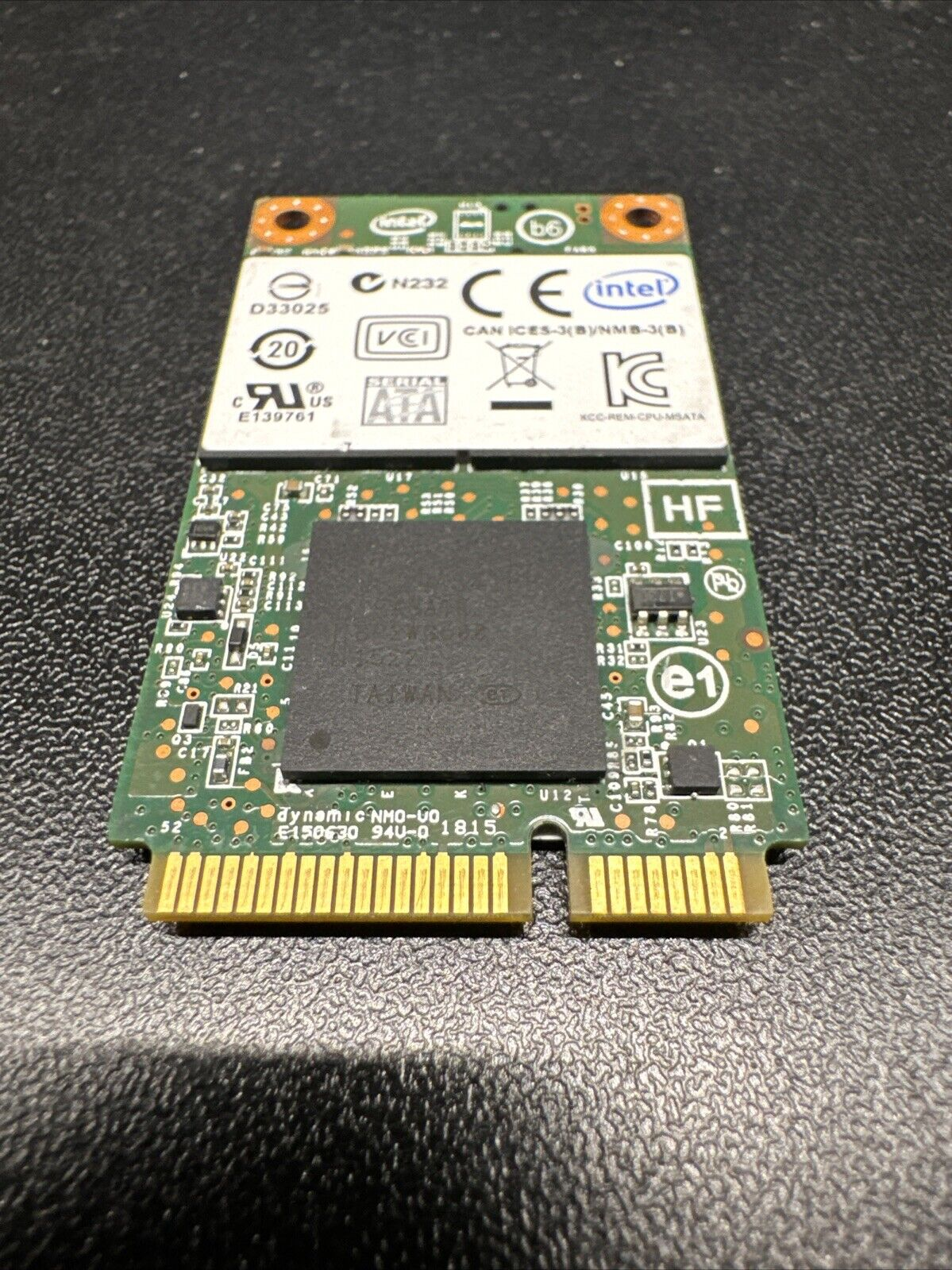
Top and bottom sides of a 100GB Intel DC S3700 SATA SSD and a 120GB Intel 535 mSATA SSD.

Flash memory, a key component in modern SSDs, was invented in 1980 by Fujio Masuoka at Toshiba. Flash-based SSDs were patented in 1989 by the founders of SanDisk, which released its first product in 1991: a 20 MB SSD for IBM laptops. While the storage capacity was limited and the price high (around $1,000), this marked the beginning of a transition to flash memory as an alternative to traditional hard drives.

In the 1990s, new manufacturers of flash memory drives emerged, including STEC, Inc., M-Systems, and BiTMICRO.

As the technology advanced, SSDs saw dramatic improvements in capacity, speed, and affordability. By 2016, commercially available SSDs had more capacity than the largest available HDDs. By 2018, flash-based SSDs had reached capacities of up to 100 TB in enterprise products, with consumer SSDs offering up to 16 TB. These advancements were accompanied by significant increases in read and write speeds, with some high-end consumer models reaching speeds of up to 14.5 GB/s.

In 2021, NVMe 2.0 with Zoned Namespaces (ZNS) was announced. ZNS allows data to be mapped directly to its physical location in memory, providing direct access on an SSD without a flash translation layer. In 2024, Samsung announced what it called the world's first SSD with a hybrid PCIe interface, the Samsung 990 EVO. The hybrid interface runs in either the x4 PCIe 4.0 or x2 PCIe 5.0 modes, a first for an M.2 SSD.

SSD prices have also fallen dramatically, with the cost per gigabyte decreasing from around $50,000 in 1991 to less than $0.05 by 2020.

=== Enterprise flash drives ===
Enterprise flash drives (EFDs), also known as enterprise solid-state drives (eSSDs), are designed for high-performance applications requiring fast input/output operations per second (IOPS), reliability, and energy efficiency. EFDs often have higher specifications than consumer SSDs (cSSDs), including enterprise-class flashes, supercapacators for robust power loss protection (PLP), larger DRAM buffers, and more flash channels, making them suitable for mission-critical applications. The term was first used by EMC in 2008 to describe SSDs built for enterprise environments.

One example of an EFD is the Intel DC S3700 series, launched in 2012. These drives were notable for their consistent performance, maintaining IOPS variation within a narrow range, which is crucial for enterprise environments.

Another significant product is the Toshiba PX02SS series, launched in 2016. Designed for write-intensive applications like online transaction processing, these drives achieved impressive read and write speeds and high endurance ratings.

EFDs include 3 performance workload classes: Read Intensive, Mixed Use and Write Intensive. Read Intensive EFD is usually budget but slower write performance.

=== Drives using other persistent memory technologies ===
In 2017, Intel introduced SSDs based on 3D XPoint technology under the Optane brand. Unlike NAND flash, 3D XPoint uses a different method to store data, offering higher IOPS performance, although sequential read and write speeds remain slower compared to traditional SSDs.

=== Consumer use ===
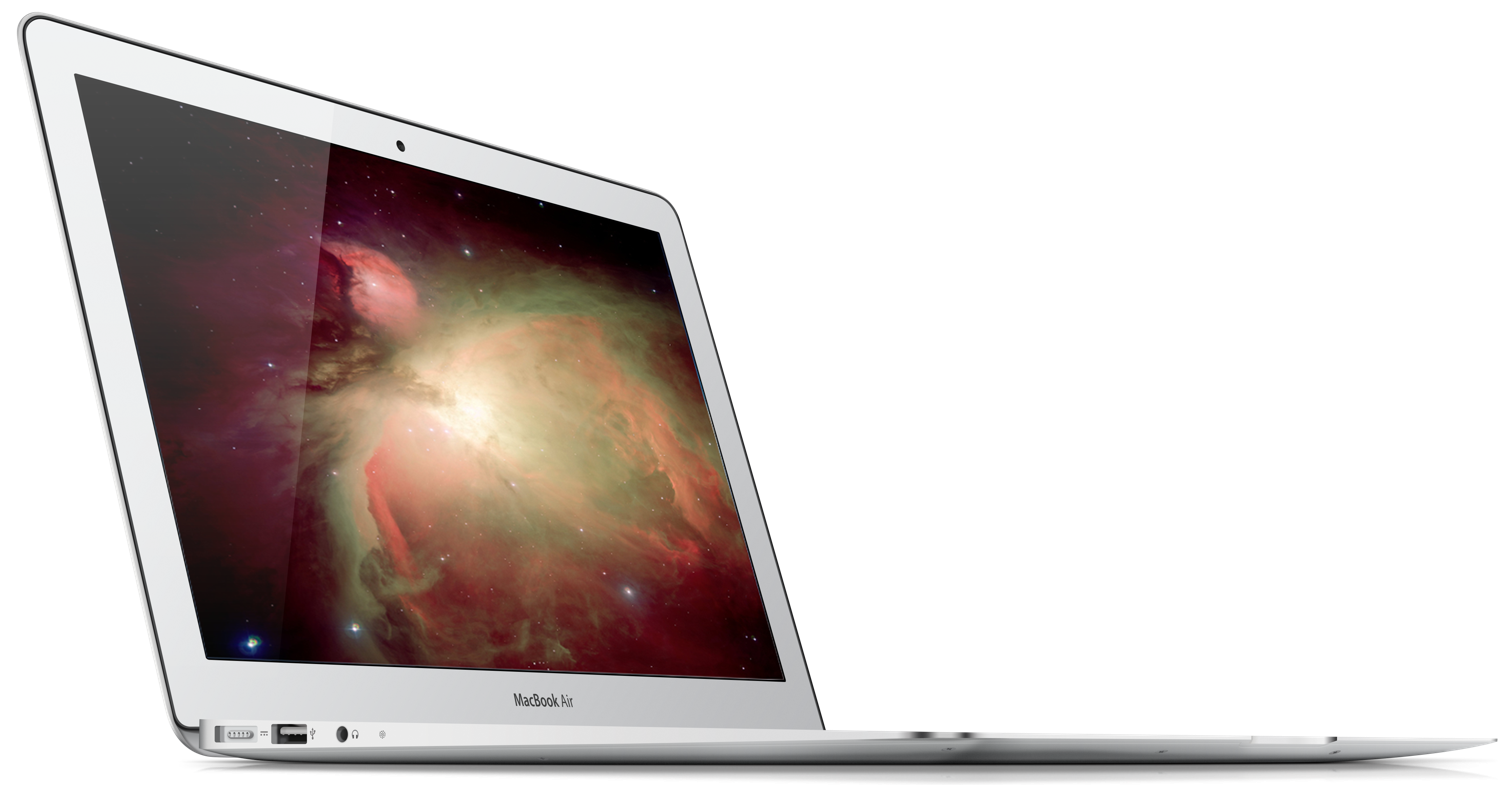
The MacBook Air and Ultrabooks are the earliest popular implementations of SSD. Alongside inarguable faster speed resulting in absolutely-better systems' performance, SSD are also thinner and smaller than HDD, allowing modern laptops to be lighter and sleeker without memory-related compromise of productivity.

As SSD technology continues to improve, they are increasingly used in ultra-mobile PCs and lightweight laptop systems. The first flash-memory SSD based PC to become available was the Sony Vaio UX90, announced for pre-order on 27 June 2006 and began shipping in Japan on 3 July 2006 with a 16 GB flash memory hard drive. Another of the first mainstream releases of SSD was the XO Laptop, built as part of the One Laptop Per Child project. Mass production of these computers, built for children in developing countries, began in December 2007. By 2009, Dell, Toshiba, Asus, Apple, and Lenovo had begun producing laptops with SSDs.

By 2010, Apple's MacBook Air line began using solid state drives as the default. In 2011, Intel's Ultrabook became the first widely available consumer computers using SSDs aside from the MacBook Air. At present, SSD devices are widely used and distributed by a number of companies, with a small number of companies manufacturing the NAND flash devices within them.

=== Sales ===
SSD shipments were approximately 11 million units in 2009, rising to 17.3 million units in 2011 for a total market value of US$5 billion. Shipments continued to grow to 39 million units in 2012 and were projected to reach 83 million units in 2013, 201.4 million units in 2016, and 227 million units in 2017.

Tom's Hardware, citing a 2024 analysis from Yole Group, projected that SSD revenues will rise from USD 29 billion in 2022 to USD 67 billion by 2028.

The global solid-state drive (SSD) market is projected to grow significantly between 2024 and 2030, driven by rising demand for data center expansion, cloud computing services, and consumer electronics upgrades. In a 2024 report, Grand View Research estimated the SSD market at USD 19.1 billion in 2023 and projected it to reach USD 55.1 billion by 2030. In a separate 2024 study, Mordor Intelligence valued the market at USD 63.45 billion for 2024, forecasting growth to USD 172.82 billion by 2030.

== File-system support ==
The same file systems used on hard disk drives can typically also be used on solid state drives. File systems that support SSDs generally also support the TRIM command, which helps the SSD to recycle discarded data. The file system does not need to manage wear leveling or other flash memory characteristics, as they are handled internally by the SSD. Some log-structured file systems (e.g. F2FS, JFFS2) help to reduce write amplification on SSDs, especially in situations where only very small amounts of data are changed, such as when updating file-system metadata.

If an operating system does not support using TRIM on discrete swap partitions, it might be possible to use swap files inside an ordinary file system instead. For example, macOS does not support swap partitions; it only swaps to files within a file system, so it can use TRIM when, for example, swap files are deleted.

=== Linux ===
Since 2010, standard Linux drive utilities have taken care of appropriate partition alignment by default.

Kernel support for the TRIM operation was introduced in version 2.6.33 of the Linux kernel mainline, released on 24 February 2010. The ext4, Btrfs, XFS, JFS, and F2FS file systems include support for the discard (TRIM or UNMAP) function. Non-native file systems such as exFAT and NTFS-3G also support TRIM. To automatically make use of TRIM on file deletion, a file system must be mounted using the discard parameter. Linux swap partitions are by default performing discard operations when the underlying drive supports TRIM, with the possibility to turn them off. Support for queued TRIM, a SATA 3.1 feature that results in TRIM commands not disrupting the command queues, was introduced in Linux kernel 3.12, released on November 2, 2013.

An alternative to the kernel-level TRIM operation is to use a user-space utility called fstrim that goes through all of the unused blocks in a filesystem and dispatches TRIM commands for those areas. Thefstrimutility is usually run by cron or systemd as a scheduled task. A filesystem that supports TRIM remains required.

Whether formatting or resizing trims the unused space depends on the implementation. For example, the mke2fs program for formatting ext2/3/4 defaults to issuing a TRIM command (if supported) to the entire block, but the resize2fs program for resizing ext2/3/4 does not TRIM the space left unused after shrinking. TRIM-after-resize is instead done by fdisk or sfdisk, programs that edit the partition table.

In addition, bcache is designed to have an SSD act as a read/write cache for a slower drive such as an HDD.

=== macOS ===
Versions since Mac OS X 10.6.8 (Snow Leopard) support TRIM but only when used with an Apple-purchased SSD. TRIM is not automatically enabled for third-party drives, except for external removable SSDs, although it can be enabled by using third-party utilities such as Trim Enabler. The status of TRIM can be checked in the System Information application or in the system_profiler command-line tool.

Versions since OS X 10.10.4 (Yosemite) include sudo trimforce enable as a Terminal command that enables TRIM on non-Apple SSDs. There is also a technique to enable TRIM in versions earlier than Mac OS X 10.6.8, although it remains uncertain whether TRIM is actually utilized properly in those cases.

=== Microsoft Windows ===
Prior to Windows 7, Microsoft Windows did not take any specific measures to support solid state drives. From Windows 7, the standard NTFS file system provides support for the TRIM command.

By default, Windows 7 and newer versions execute TRIM commands automatically if the device is detected to be a solid-state drive and the filesystem driver supports TRIM (NTFS or ReFS). However, because TRIM irreversibly resets all freed space, it may be desirable to disable support where enabling data recovery is preferred over wear leveling. Windows implements TRIM for more than just file-delete operations. The TRIM operation is integrated with partition- and volume-level commands such as format and delete, with file-system commands relating to truncate and compression, and with the System Restore (also known as Volume Snapshot) feature.

Defragmentation should be disabled on solid-state drives because the location of the file components on an SSD does not significantly impact its performance, but moving the files to make them contiguous using the Windows Defrag routine will cause unnecessary write wear on the limited number of write cycles on the SSD. The SuperFetch feature will also not materially improve performance and causes additional overhead in the system and SSD. Since Windows 8.1, the Windows Defrag routine would instead "retrim" (TRIM) partitions detected as SSDs.

==== Windows Vista ====
Windows Vista generally expects hard disk drives rather than SSDs. Windows Vista includes ReadyBoost to exploit characteristics of USB-connected flash devices, but for SSDs it only improves the default partition alignment to prevent read-modify-write operations that reduce the speed of SSDs. Most SSDs are typically split into 4 KiB sectors, while earlier systems may be based on 512 byte sectors with their default partition setups unaligned to the 4 KiB boundaries. Windows Vista does not send the TRIM command to solid-state drives, but some third-party utilities such as SSD Doctor will periodically scan the drive and TRIM the appropriate entries.

==== Windows 7 ====
Windows 7 and later versions have native support for SSDs. The operating system detects the presence of an SSD and optimizes operation accordingly. For SSD devices, Windows 7 disables ReadyBoost and automatic defragmentation. Despite the initial statement by Steven Sinofsky before the release of Windows 7, however, defragmentation is not disabled, even though its behavior on SSDs differs. One reason is the low performance of Volume Shadow Copy Service on fragmented SSDs. The second reason is to avoid reaching the practical maximum number of file fragments that a volume can handle.

Windows 7 also includes support for the TRIM command to reduce garbage collection for data that the operating system has already determined is no longer valid.

==== Windows 8.1 and later ====
Windows 8.1 and later Windows systems also support automatic TRIM for PCI Express SSDs based on NVMe. For Windows 7, the KB2990941 update is required for this functionality and needs to be integrated into Windows Setup using DISM if Windows 7 has to be installed on the NVMe SSD. Windows 8/8.1 also supports the SCSI unmap command, for SAS-attached SSDs; It is also supported over USB Attached SCSI Protocol (UASP).

While Windows 7 supported continuous TRIM for internal SATA SSDs, Windows 8.1 and above support manual TRIM as well as periodic TRIM for SATA, NVMe and USB-attached SSDs. Manual TRIM is accessed through the expanded Windows Defrag utility.

=== ZFS ===
Solaris as of version 10 Update 6 (released in October 2008), and recent versions of OpenSolaris, Solaris Express Community Edition, Illumos, Linux with ZFS on Linux, and FreeBSD all can use SSDs as a performance booster for ZFS. A low-latency SSD can be used for the ZFS Intent Log (ZIL), where it is named the SLOG. An SSD may also be used for the level 2 Adaptive Replacement Cache (L2ARC), which is used to cache data for reading.

=== FreeBSD ===
ZFS for FreeBSD introduced support for TRIM on September 23, 2012. The Unix File System also supports the TRIM command.

== Standardization organizations ==
The following are noted standardization organizations and bodies that work to create standards for solid-state drives (and other computer storage devices). The table below also includes organizations which promote the use of solid-state drives. This is not necessarily an exhaustive list.

Organization or committee	Subcommittee of:	Purpose
INCITS	—N/a	Coordinates technical standards activity between ANSI in the US and joint ISO/IEC committees worldwide
T10	INCITS	SCSI
T11	INCITS	FC
T13	INCITS	ATA
JEDEC	—N/a	Develops open standards and publications for the microelectronics industry
JC-64.8	JEDEC	Focuses on solid-state drive standards and publications
NVMHCI	—N/a	Provides standard software and hardware programming interfaces for nonvolatile memory subsystems
SATA-IO	—N/a	Provides the industry with guidance and support for implementing the SATA specification
SFF Committee	—N/a	Works on storage industry standards needing attention when not addressed by other standards committees
SNIA	—N/a	Develops and promotes standards, technologies, and educational services in the management of information
SSSI	SNIA	Fosters the growth and success of solid state storage

== Gallery ==
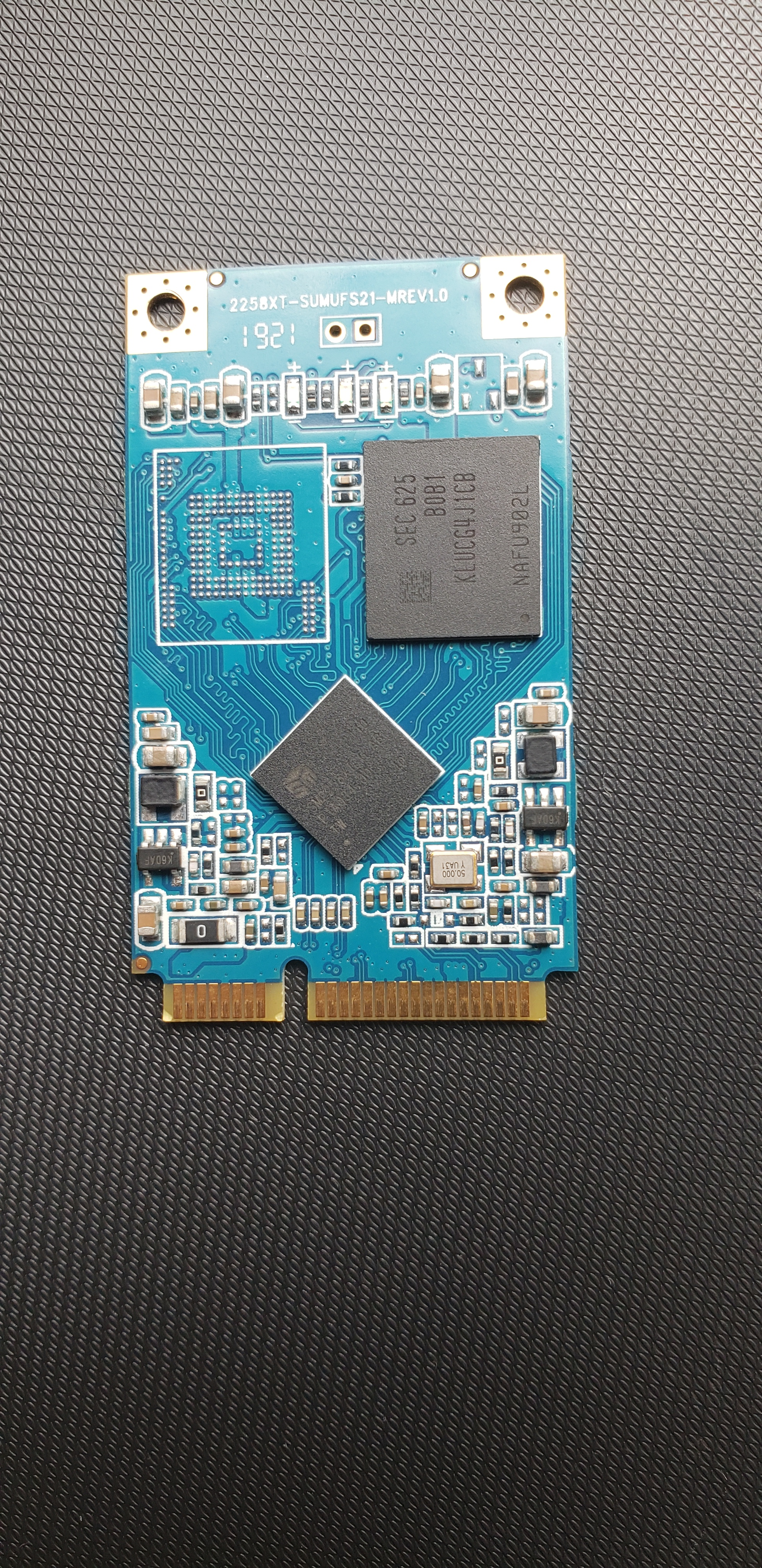
MSATA SSD with label removed to show its NAND and controller

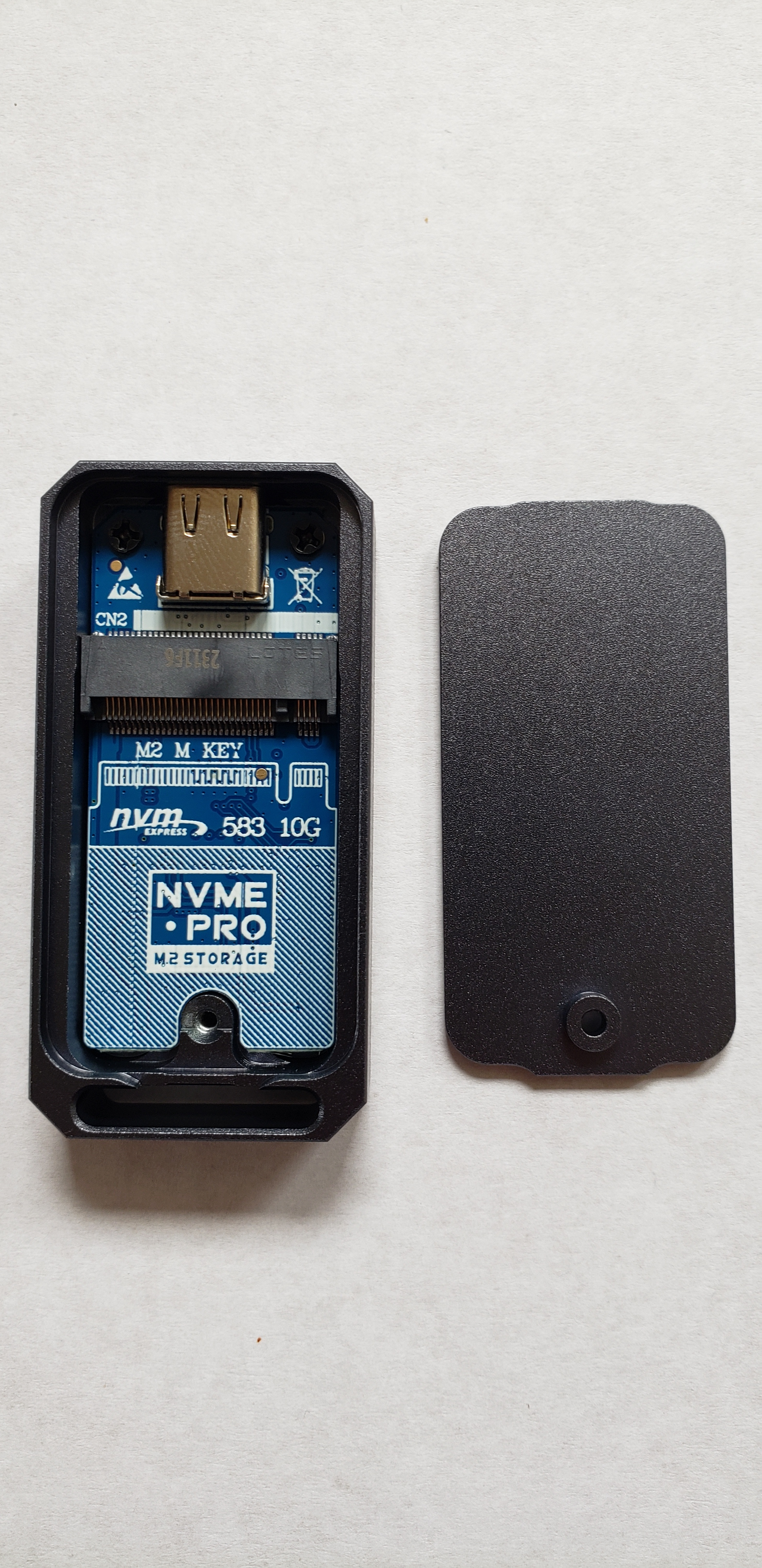
Inside a USB 3.0 Enclosure to a 2230 M.2 NVME SSD

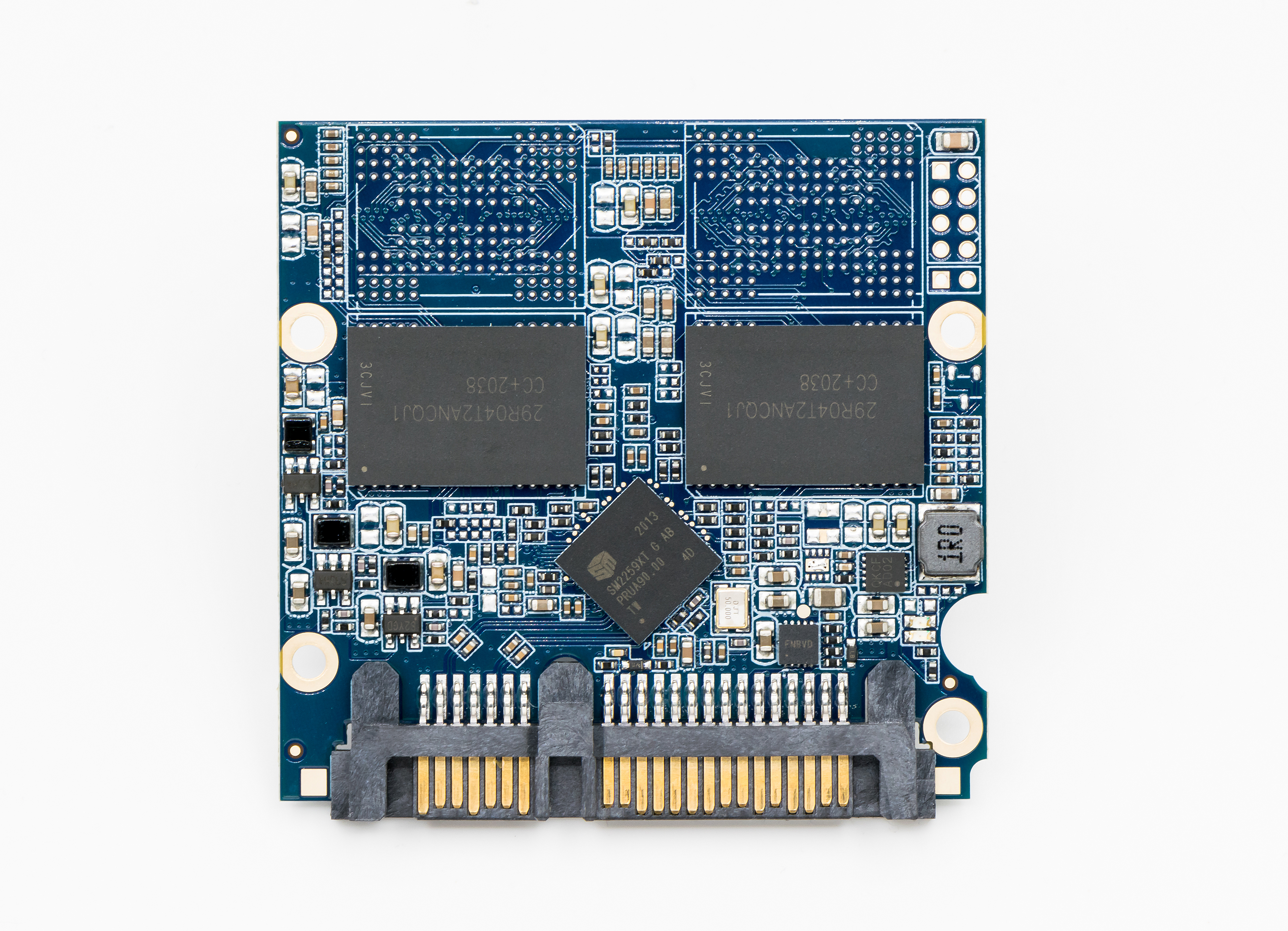
PCB circuit board of a 2.5" SATA SSD

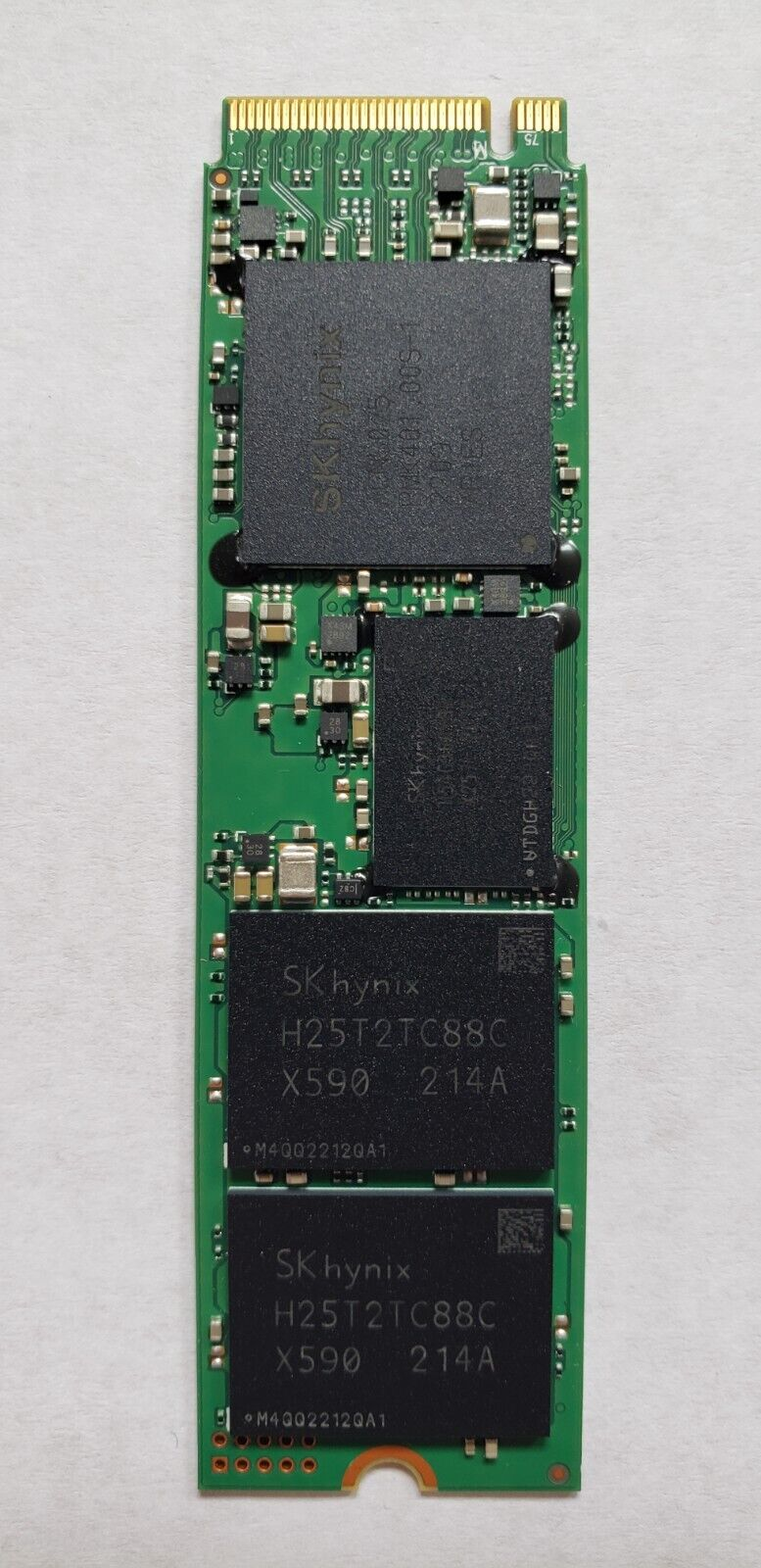
PCB circuit board of a 2280 NVMe SSD

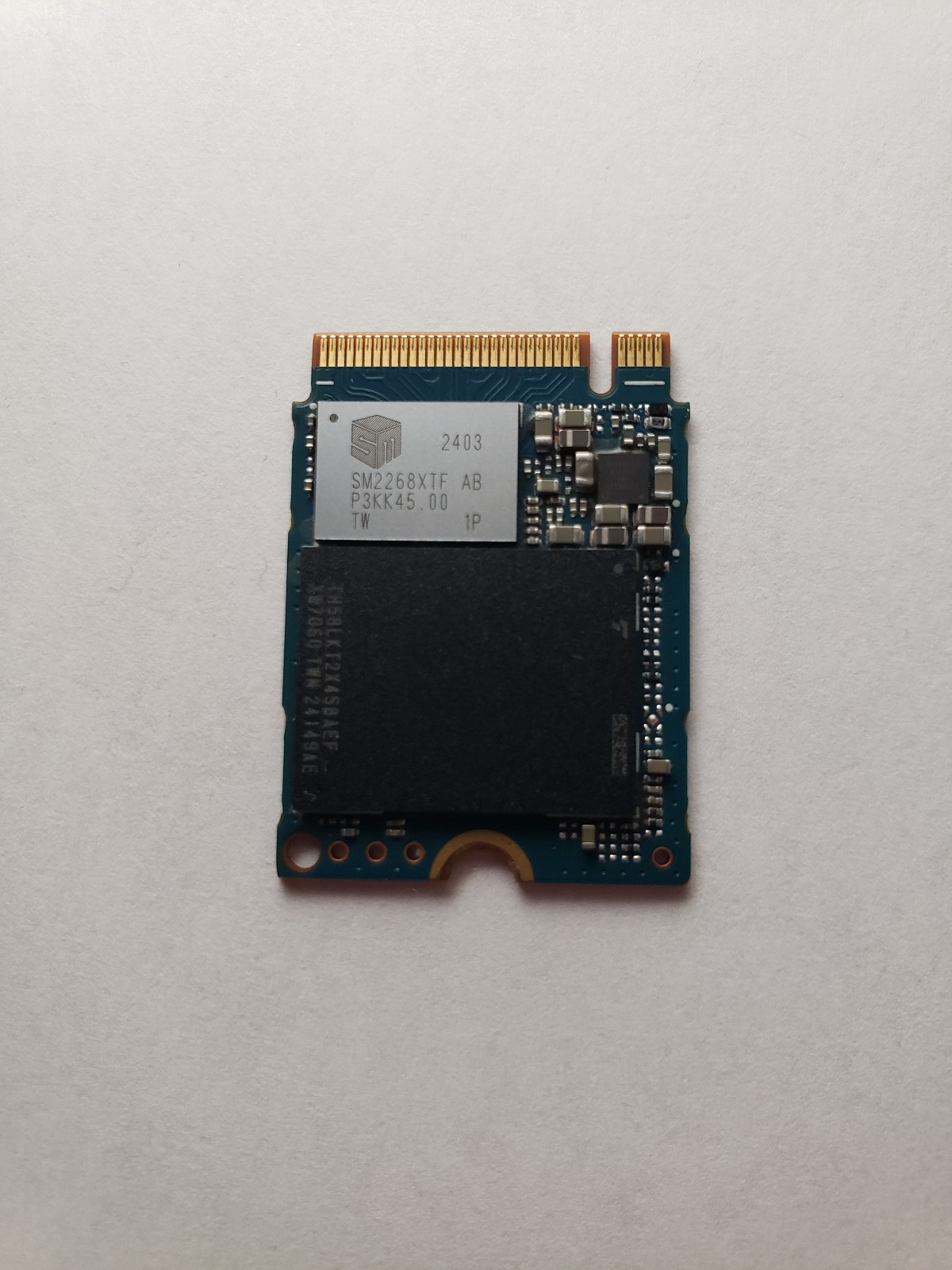
PCB circuit board of a 2230 NVMe SSD

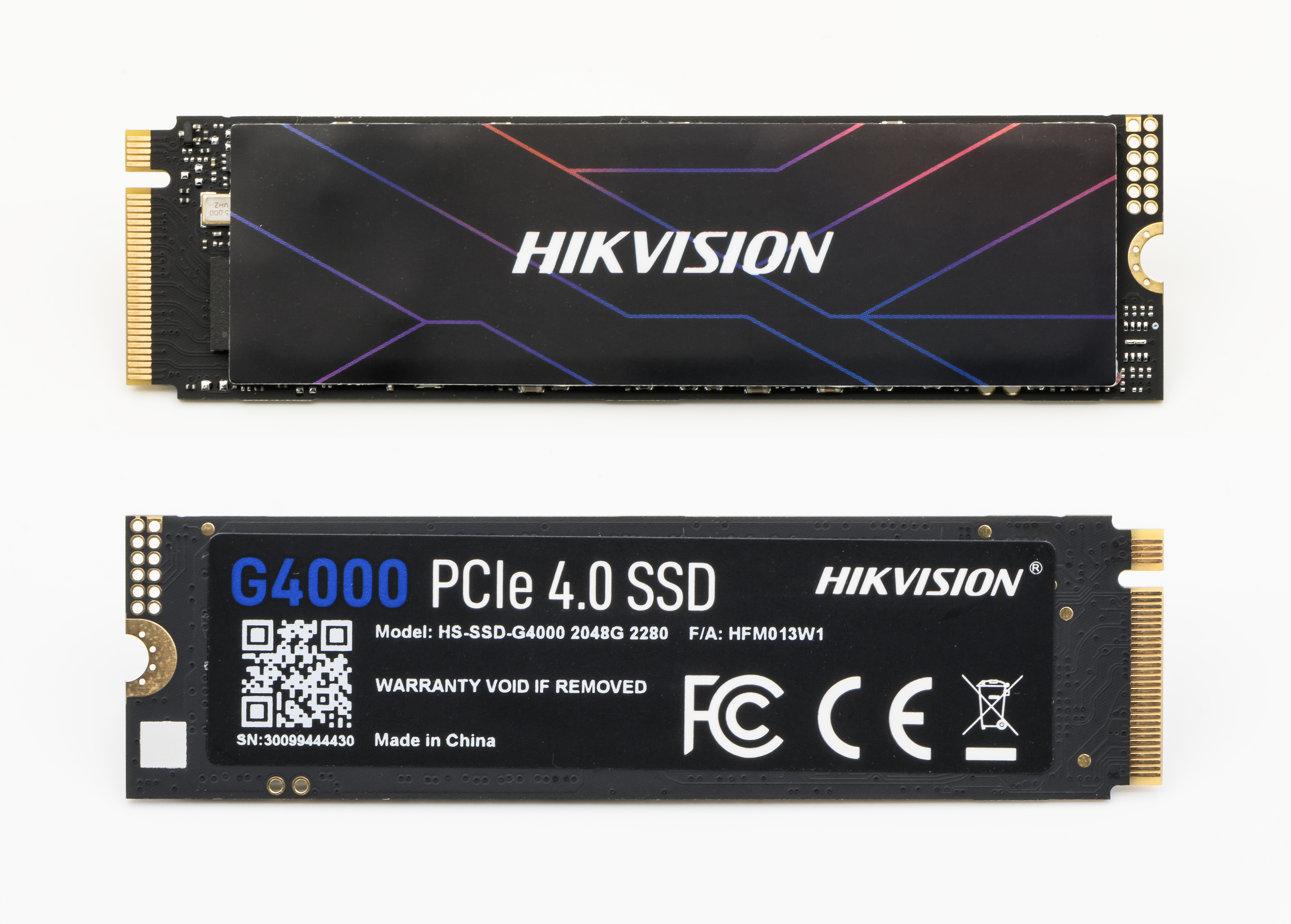
Hikvision G4000 2TB solid-state drive

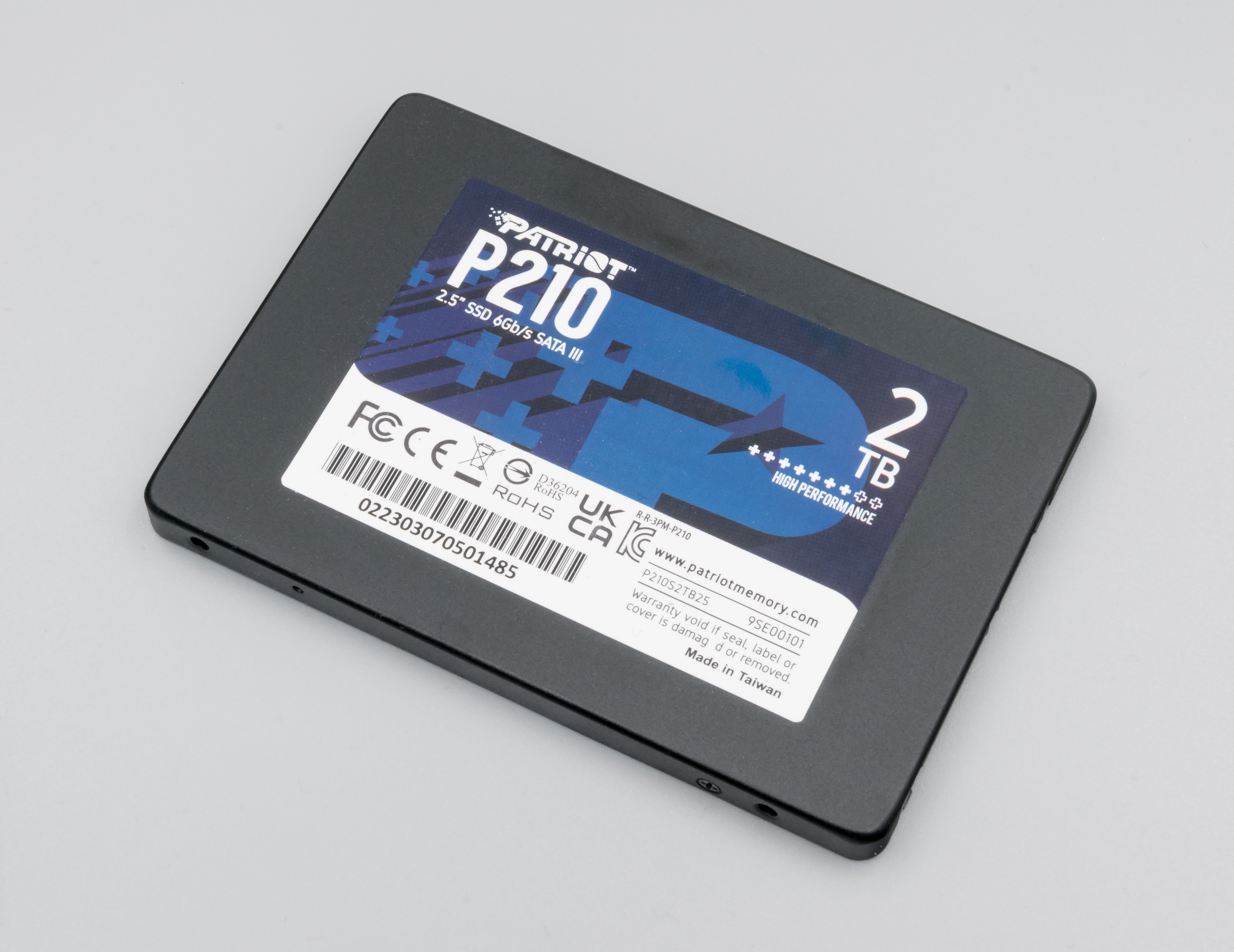
SSD drive Patriot P210 2TB

A BC901 (SED)

== See also ==
- Board solid-state drive
- Dynamic random-access memory
- Flash Core Module
- Hard disk drive
- List of flash memory controller manufacturers
- List of solid-state drive manufacturers
- RAID
- RAM drive
