= Ex-patriot =

Ex-patriot may be:

- Ex-PATRIOT Act, 2012 American legislative bill
- Rush'n Attack: Ex-Patriot, 2011 PlayStation 3 video game
- An eggcorn of expatriate, a person who lives abroad

== See also ==
- Patriot (disambiguation)
