= Patriot =

A patriot is a person with the quality of patriotism.

Patriot(s) or The Patriot(s) may also refer to:

== Political and military groups ==
=== United States ===
- Patriot (American Revolution), those who supported the cause of independence in the American Revolution
- Patriot movement, a small-government or anti-government conservative movement in the United States
- Christian Patriot movement, a far-right conservative movement in the United States

=== Elsewhere ===
- Patriot (company) (Russian: ЧВК «Патриот»), a Russian private military and security company
- Patriot Party (disambiguation), various parties
- Patriotten, a Dutch political faction in the 18th century
- Arbegnoch (lit. patriots), Ethiopian resistance fighters, 1939–1941
- Patriot Governments (Spanish American independence), those who supported independence in South America, 1808–1833
- The Patriots (France), a French eurosceptic political party
- Patriote movement, a political movement in Québec, Canada, during the 19th century
- Hunter Patriots, in the Canadian Rebellions of 1836–1841
- Patriotic Union of Kurdistan, a political party in the region of Kurdistan
- Patriots for Europe, a group in the European Parliament

== Arts and media ==
=== Film ===
- The Patriot (1928 film), biographical film about Paul I of Russia
- The Patriots, a 1933 Boris Barnet film known as Okraina in Russia
- Patriots (1937 film), German film
- The Patriot (1938 film), French historical drama film
- The Patriot (1953 film), Iranian drama film
- The Patriot (1986 film), action film directed by Frank Harris
- Patriots (1994 film), American film by Frank Kerr
- The Patriots (film), 1994 French film that starred Yvan Attal
- The Patriot (1998 film), Steven Seagal action film
- The Patriot (2000 film), film starring Mel Gibson and Heath Ledger
  - The Patriot (soundtrack)
- A Patriot, a film by White Lantern Films cancelled in 2020, starring Eva Green
- Patriot (2026 film), Indian film

=== TV series ===
- Patriot (TV series), a 2015 Amazon TV series
- The Patriots (TV series), 1962 Australian miniseries
- "The Patriot", episode 10 of season 4 of TV series Agents of S.H.I.E.L.D. (2016-2017)
- Hapatriotim (The Patriots), daily Israeli television program

=== Newspapers ===
- California Patriot, a conservative student magazine of the University of California, Berkeley
- The Lebanon Patriot, now defunct, published weekly in Lebanon, Ohio
- The Patriot Ledger, covering the south shore of Massachusetts
- The Patriot-News, serving the Harrisburg, Pennsylvania area
- The Patriot, published by the South Australian Temperance Alliance

=== Books ===
- The Patriot, a 1939 novel by Pearl S. Buck
- Patriot: A Memoir, a 2024 posthumous memoir by Russian dissident Alexei Navalny
- Patriots (novel series), by James Wesley Rawles

=== Plays ===
- The Patriot (play), a 1702 play by Charles Gildon
- The Patriots (play), a 1943 play by Sidney Kingsley
- Patriots (play), a 2022 play by Peter Morgan

=== Other media ===
- Patriot (Marvel Comics), comic book characters
- Patriot (video game), a 1993 strategy game about the Gulf War
- Patriot (Johnny Cash album), 1991 compilation
- Patriot (Tublatanka album), 2010 album
- Sirius XM Patriot, a conservative satellite radio network

== Companies ==
- Patriot Coal, a coal-mining company based in St. Louis, Missouri
- Patriot Memory, a Silicon Valley memory and computer accessory manufacturer
- Patriot Rail Company, an American short line railroad company

== Places ==
- Patriot, Indiana, a town in the United States
- Patriot, Ohio, a town in the United States
- Patriot Place, a shopping and entertainment center next to Gillette Stadium in Foxborough, Mass

== Sports ==
- The Patriot (wrestler) (1961–2021), ring name of American pro Del Wilkes
- Tom Brandi (born 1966), second professional wrestler to use the ring name "The Patriot"
- The Dark Patriot (born 1969), American professional wrestler Doug Gilbert
- The Patriots, a professional wrestling tag team consisting of Firebreaker Chip and Todd Champion

=== Teams ===
- El Paso Patriots, a soccer team (USL Premier Development League), based in Texas
- Fayetteville Patriots, in the National Basketball Development League, based in North Carolina
- George Mason Patriots, in various sports, from George Mason University in Virginia
- Indonesia Patriots, nickname for the country's national basketball team
- New England Patriots, American football, in the National Football League and based in Massachusetts
- Ozark Patriots, a baseball team based in Alabama
- Somerset Patriots, a minor league baseball team based in Bridgewater, New Jersey
- Patriots Jet Team, a civilian aerobatic formation team in the United States
- Patriotas F.C., several association football teams
- Patriot Candrabhaga F.C., an Indonesian football club based in Bekasi, West Java

=== Other uses in sport ===
- Patriot League, a college athletic conference in northeastern United States
- Patriot Stadium, a soccer stadium in El Paso, Texas
- Patriot Stadium (Indonesia), a soccer stadium in Bekasi, Indonesia

== Vehicles ==
- Patriot (fireboat), a fireboat operated by Tampa, Florida
- USS Patriot (MCM-7), a U.S. Navy mine countermeasures ship launched in 1990
- LMS Patriot Class, a class of express passenger steam locomotive
- Jeep Patriot, a compact SUV manufactured by FiatChrysler
- Sikorsky VH-92 Patriot, American presidential helicopter
- UAZ Patriot, a mid-sized SUV manufactured by UAZ

== Other uses ==
- MIM-104 Patriot, a surface-to-air missile system
- Patriot (Worlds of Fun), a roller coaster
- Patriot (California's Great America), a roller coaster

== See also ==
- Patriotism (disambiguation)
- Patriot Games (disambiguation)
- Swadeshabhimani (disambiguation), Indian term lit. 'The Patriot'
