= Swadesh =

Swadesh is a given name and surname. Notable people with the name include:

- Morris Swadesh (1909–1967), American linguist
  - Swadesh list, named after its creator
- Swadesh Bose (1928–2009), Bangladeshi economist and Liberation War organiser
- Swadesh Chakraborty (born 1943), Indian politician
- Swadesh Deepak (born 1942), Indian writer

== See also ==
- Swades, a 2004 Indian Hindi-language film by Ashutosh Gowariker
- Swadeshi, a 20th-century nationalist movement in British ruled India
- Swadeshabhimani (disambiguation)
