= Swabhimaan (disambiguation) =

Swabhimaan (lit. 'self-respect') may refer to:

- Swabhimana, a 1985 Indian Kannada-language film
- Swabhimaan, a 1995 Indian Hindi-language TV series
- Swabhimaan (campaign), a financial scheme of the Indian government launched in 2014
- Ek Shringaar – Swabhiman, a 2016 Indian Hindi-language TV series
- Swabhiman – Shodh Astitvacha, a 2021 Indian Marathi-language TV series

== See also ==
- Abhimaan (disambiguation)
- Swabhimani Shetkari Saghtana, a farmers union based in Kolhapur, Maharashtra, India
- Swabhimani Paksha, a political party in Maharashtra, India
