= Abhimaan =

Abhimaan (lit. 'pride') may refer to:

- Abhimaan (1957 film), a Bollywood film of 1957
- Abhimaan (1973 film), a Bollywood film by Hrishikesh Mukherjee, starring Amitabh Bachchan and Jaya Bachchan
- Abhimaan (1977 film), starring Sadhu Meher
- Abhimaan (1986 film), starring Kajal Gupta
- Abhimaan (2016 film), an Indian Bengali-language romantic action drama by Raj Chakraborty
- Abhimaan (TV series), an Indian television drama

== See also ==
- Abhimaanam, a 1975 Indian film
- Abhiman Roy, Indian musician
- Swabhimaan (disambiguation)
- Abhimani (disambiguation)
