= Enterprise and Data Center Standard Form Factor =

Family of form factors for SSDs

The Enterprise and Data Center Standard Form Factor (EDSFF), previously known as the Enterprise and Data Center SSD Form Factor, is a family of solid-state drive (SSD) form factors for use in data center servers.

== Form factors ==
EDSFF was developed by the Small Form Factor Technology Affiliate technical work group, which is itself under the organizational stewardship of the Storage Networking Industry Association.

As a family of form factors, it defines specifications for the mechanical dimensions and electrical interfaces devices should have, to ensure compatibility between disparate hardware manufacturers. The standard is meant to replace the U.2 form factors for drives used in data centers. EDSFF provides a pure NVMe over PCIe interface. One common way to provide EDSFF connections on the motherboard is through MCIO connectors.

EDSFF SSDs come in four form factors: E1.L (Long) and E1.S (Short), which fit vertically in a 1u server, and E3.L and E3.S, which fit vertically in a 2u server. E3.S is approximately the size of an 2.5 inch (U.2) drive.

Samsung's NGSFF (also known as M.3 or NF1) form factor competes with EDSFF.

== EDSFF compared with M.2 ==
EDSFF can use 3.3 V and 12 V for power, while M.2 only supports 3.3 V. EDSFF can use hot swap, but M.2 can not.

== See also ==
- M.2
- ePCIe
- CXL
- SFF
