= Abhimani =

Abhimani may refer to:

- The name of Agni in the Vishnu Purana
- Abhimani (film), a 2009 Indian Kannada film
- Abhimani Film Festival in Colombo, Sri Lanka, the oldest LGBTIQ film festival in South Asia
- Yare Nee Abhimani, a 2000 Indian Kannada film

== See also ==
- Abhimaan (disambiguation)
- Swadeshabhimani (disambiguation)
