= U.2 =

Computer interface standard for connecting SSDs to a computer

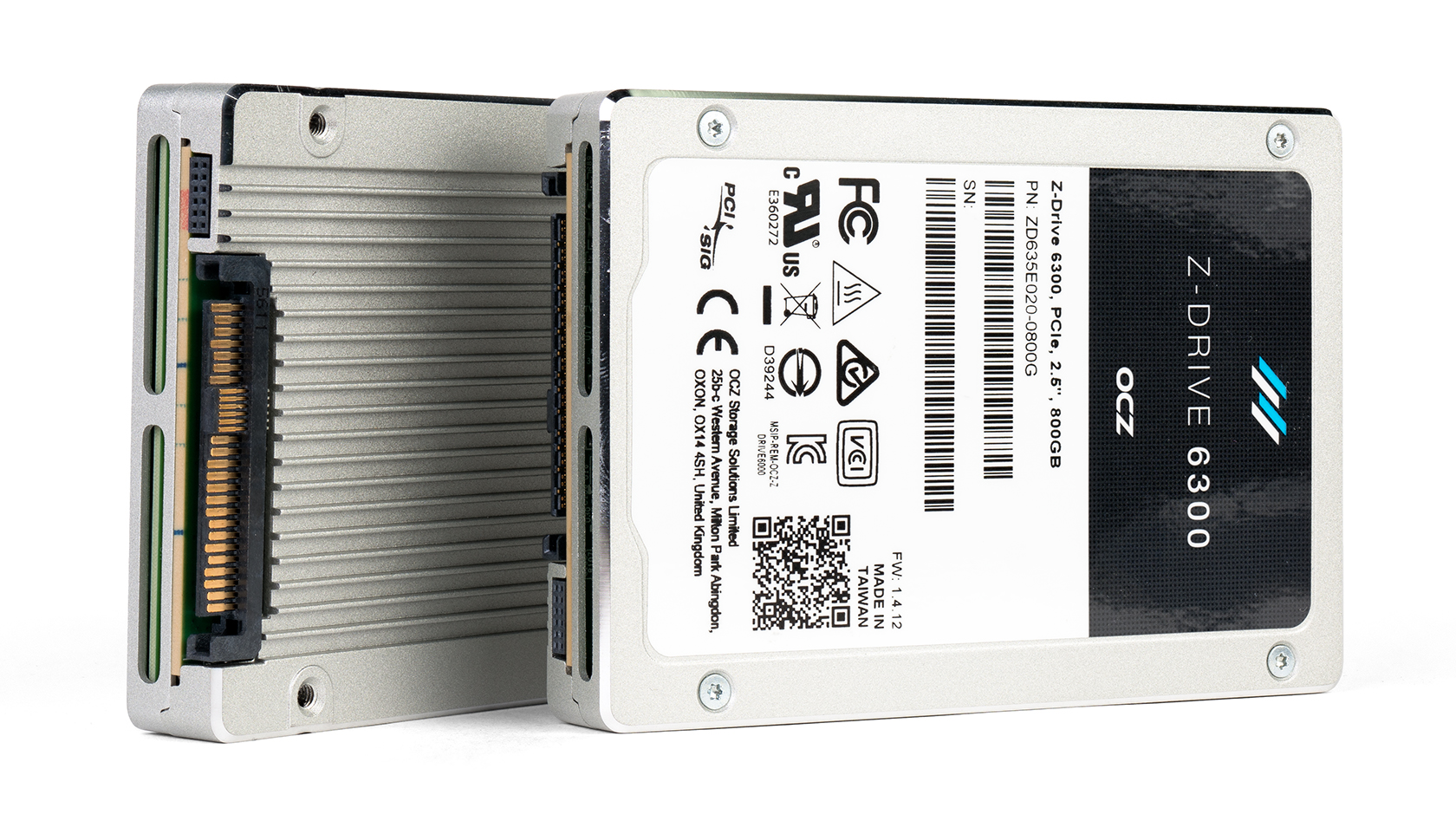
SSDs with U.2 interface

U.2 (pronounced "U-dot-2"), formerly known as SFF-8639, is a computer interface standard used to connect solid-state drives (SSDs) to a computer. It defines the physical connector, electrical characteristics, and supported communication protocols.

U.2 was developed for the enterprise storage market and is designed to support multiple types of drives, including those using PCI Express (typically with NVM Express), as well as SAS and SATA. The interface supports up to four PCIe lanes and two SATA lanes, enabling high data transfer rates while maintaining compatibility with existing drive technologies.

== History ==
The Enterprise SSD form factor was developed by the SSD Form Factor Working Group (SFFWG). The specification was released on December 20, 2011, as a mechanism for providing PCI Express connections to SSDs for the enterprise market. Goals included being usable in existing 2.5" and 3.5" form factors, to be hot swappable and to allow legacy SAS and SATA drives to be mixed using the same connector family.

In June 2015, the SFFWG announced that the connector was being renamed to U.2.

== Connector ==
The U.2 connector is mechanically identical to the SATA Express device plug, but provides four PCI Express lanes through a different usage of available pins. In practice, U.2 devices use the SATA/SAS power connector for power input.

U.2 devices may be connected to an M.2 port using an adapter.

== Availability ==
In November 2015, Intel introduced the 750 series SSD which is available in both PCI Express and U.2 variants.

Since then, U.2 has achieved a high level of support from the major storage vendors and storage appliance suppliers.

== Form factor ==
While the U.2 standard does not specify form factors for the devices which use it, in practice, U.2 is used only on 2.5" SSDs.

== U.2 compared with M.2 ==
U.2 can use 3.3 V, 5 V and 12 V for power, while M.2 only supports 3.3 V. Typical 2.5" U.2 drives are physically larger than M.2 drives, and thus typically have larger capacities. U.2 can use hot swap, but M.2 can not.

== U.3 ==
U.3 (SFF-TA-1001) is built on the U.2 spec and uses the same SFF-8639 connector. A single "tri-mode" (PCIe/SATA/SAS) backplane receptacle can handle all three types of connections; the controller automatically detects the type of connection used. This is unlike U.2, where users need to use separate controllers for SATA/SAS and NVMe. U.3 devices are required to be backwards-compatible with U.2 hosts. U.2 devices are not compatible and cannot be used with U.3 hosts.

== See also ==
- EDSFF
- Hard disk drive
- M.2
