= Patriotism (disambiguation) =

Patriotism is the feeling of love, devotion, and sense of attachment to a homeland and alliance with other citizens who share the same sentiment.

Patriotism may also refer to:

- Patriotism (short story), a 1960 short story by Yukio Mishima
- Patriotism (1966 film), a Japanese short film, based on the short story by Yukio Mishima
- Patriotism (1918 film), an American silent drama film
- "Patriotism" (Stewart Lee's Comedy Vehicle), a TV episode

== See also ==
- Patriot (disambiguation)
