= Swadeshabhimani (disambiguation) =

Swadeshabhimani or Svadeshabhimani means The Patriot in Indian languages and may also refer to:

- Svadeshabhimani (newspaper), a newspaper
- Swadeshabhimani Ramakrishna Pillai, the editor of the newspaper
- Vakkom Moulavi, the publisher of Swadeshabhimani

== See also ==
- The Patriot (disambiguation)
- Swadesh (disambiguation)
- Abhimani (disambiguation)
