= Patriot (fireboat) =

Fireboat operating in Florida, USA

The Patriot is a fireboat operating in Tampa, Florida, United States, from 2009 to present. The vessel cost $3.8 million. She was built in Kingston, Ontario, Canada. She is 69 feet (21 m) long, and displaces 52 tonnes.

The vessel was paid for through a FEMA Port Security Grant. So, in addition to being able to fight fires, her cabin is sealed, so she can respond to chemical, biological or radiological threats.

According to WFLA she has not been put into use since 2015, when her engines became fouled by barnacles. She is propelled by waterjets. WFLA reported fire officials were critical of the fact that the boat's high-tech propulsion system had to be hauled out of the barnacle-infested water when not it use. The barnacles have since been removed; the boat has been repainted to grey and red and returned to service.
