= Patriotas FC =

Patriotas FC may refer to:

- Patriotas Boyacá, Colombian football club from Tunja.
- Patriotas Fútbol Club, Paraguayan football club from Hernandarias, Alto Paraná.
- Patriotas Futebol Clube, Brazilian football club from Curitiba, Paraná.
