= Patriot Games (disambiguation) =

Patriot Games is a 1987 novel by Tom Clancy.

Patriot Game(s) may also refer to:

- Patriot Games (film), a 1992 film adaptation of Tom Clancy's book that stars Harrison Ford
- "Patriot Games" (Family Guy), a 2006 television episode
- "Patriot Games" (Modern Family), a 2015 television episode
- "Patriot Games" (Murdoch Mysteries), a 2022 television episode
- "Patriot Games" (The Simpsons), a 2016 television episode, later re-titled "The Town"
- "The Patriot Game", an Irish ballad with a melody from the traditional tune "The Merry Month of May"
- Patriot Games (event), an event launched by Donald Trump in 2026 as part of the United States Semiquincentennial.
- Traverse City Patriot Game, an annual high school football game in Traverse City, Michigan
