= List of networked storage hardware platforms =

Manufacturer	Product Family	Start capacity (TB)	Max Capacity (TB)	Block Protocols	File protocols
3PAR	InServ	2.3	960	FC, iSCSI	
Adaptec	Snap Server	0.2	44	iSCSI	AFP, SMB, FTP, HTTP, NFS
Coraid	EtherDrive	1	24	AoE	
Dell Compellent	Storage Center	1	720	FC, iSCSI	
Dell/EMC	AX	0.7	45	iSCSI	
Dell/EMC	CX	0.7	38	FC	
Dell EqualLogic	PS	3.5	84	iSCSI	
Dell	PowerVault MD	0.1	18	iSCSI	
Dell	PowerVault NX	0.1	18	FC, iSCSI	SMB
EMC	CLARiiON	0.3	353	FC, iSCSI	
EMC	Symmetrix	2	1054	FC, iSCSI	
HDS	HUS	2	2880	FC, iSCSI	SMB, NFS, FTP
HDS	SMS	1.2	9	iSCSI	
HP	AiO	1	72	iSCSI	SMB, NFS, FTP, WebDAV
HP	XP	2.7	851	FC, iSCSI	
HP	MSA	0.2	72	FC, iSCSI	
IBM	System Storage DS	3.6	512	FC	
Infortrend	ESVA	2.4	5376	FC, iSCSI	
Infortrend	EonStor DS	0.3	960	FC, iSCSI	
Infortrend	EonStor	0.07	336	FC, iSCSI	
Infortrend	EonNAS	0.3	960	FC, iSCSI	
Isilon	IQ X-series	1.8	1152		SMB, NFS
LSI	Engenio	1	112	FC, iSCSI	
NetApp	FAS	4	1176	FC, iSCSI	SMB, NFS, FTP, WebDAV
NetApp	StoreVault	1	12	FC, iSCSI	SMB, NFS
Nexsan	SATAboy/SATAbeast	4	42	FC, iSCSI	
Pillar	Axiom	6.5	832	FC, iSCSI	SMB, NFS, FTP
Sun	StorageTek 5000	2	420	iSCSI	SMB, NFS, FTP
Sun	SunFire X4500	12	24	iSCSI	SMB, NFS, FTP, WebDAV
Kaminario	K2	3	100	FC	

Related articles are SAN and NAS.
