= Raidix =

Swiss software company

Raidix, LLC.
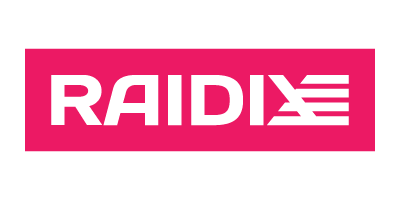
- Type: Private
- Industry: Computer Software
- Founded: 2009
- Area served: Worldwide
- Key people: Dmitriy Livshets; (CEO); Sergey Platonov; (Chief Strategist)
- Products: RAIDIX 5.X RAIDIX ERA

Raidix (stylized RAIDIX) is a private company that sells software products for professional SAN and NAS storage systems. RAIDIX supports InfiniBand, iSCSI and FibreChannel interfaces and transforms the standard x64 server hardware into a storage solution.

Raidix was founded in 2009.
