= Internet Storage Name Service =

In computing, the proposed Internet Storage Name Service (iSNS) protocol allows automated discovery, management and configuration of iSCSI and Fibre Channel devices (using iFCP gateways) on a TCP/IP network.

== Features ==
iSNS provides management services similar to those found in Fibre Channel networks, allowing a standard IP network to operate in much the same way that a Fibre Channel storage area network does. Because iSNS is able to emulate Fibre Channel fabric services and manage both iSCSI and Fibre Channel devices, an iSNS server can be used as a consolidated configuration point for an entire storage network. However, the use of iSNS is optional for iSCSI while it is required for iFCP. Additionally, an iSNS implementation is not required by the standard to provide support for both of these protocols.

== Components ==
The iSNS standard defines four components:

The iSNS Protocol
iSNSP is a protocol that specifies how iSNS clients and servers communicate. It is intended to be used by various platforms, including switches and targets as well as server hosts.

iSNS Clients
iSNS clients are part of iSNSP aware storage devices. iSNS clients initiate transactions with iSNS servers using the iSNSP, register device attribute information in a common Discovery Domain (DD), download information about other registered clients and receive asynchronous notification of events that occur in their DD(s).

iSNS Servers
iSNS servers respond to iSNS protocol queries and requests made by iSNS clients using the iSNSP. iSNS servers initiate iSNSP State Change Notifications and store properly authenticated information submitted by a registration request in an iSNS database.

iSNS Databases
iSNS databases are the information repositories for iSNS server(s). They maintain information about iSNS client attributes; while implementations will vary, a directory-enabled implementation of iSNS, for example, might store client attributes in an LDAP directory.

== Services ==
An iSNS implementation provides four primary services:

- Name registration and storage resource discovery
- Discovery domains and login control
- State-change notification
- Bidirectional mappings between Fibre Channel and iSCSI devices

=== Name registration and storage resource discovery ===
iSNS implementations allow all entities in a storage network to register and query an iSNS database. Both targets and initiators can register with the iSNS database, and each entity can inquire about other initiators and targets. For example, a client initiator can obtain information about target devices from an iSNS server.

=== Discovery domains and login control ===
Administrators can use the discovery domains to divide storage nodes into manageable, non-exclusive groups. By grouping storage nodes, administrators are able to limit the login process of each host to the most appropriate subset of targets registered with the iSNS, which allows the storage network to scale by reducing the number of unnecessary logins and by limiting the amount of time each host spends establishing login relationships.

Each target is able to use login control to delegate their access control and authorization policies to an iSNS server. Such delegation is intended to promote centralized management.

=== State-change notification ===
The state-change notification (SCN) service allows an iSNS server to issue notifications about each event that affects storage nodes on the managed network. Each iSNS client may register for notifications on behalf of its storage nodes, and each client is expected to respond according to its own requirements and implementation.

=== Bidirectional mappings between Fibre Channel and iSCSI devices ===
Because the iSNS database stores naming and discovery information about both Fibre Channel and iSCSI devices, iSNS servers are able to store mappings of Fibre Channel devices to proxy iSCSI device images on the IP network. These mappings may also be made in the opposite direction, allowing iSNS servers to store mappings from iSCSI devices to proxy World Wide Names (WWNs).
