= Virtual file server =

In computing, a virtual file server is a system consisting of one or more virtualized devices that store computer files such as documents, sound files, photographs, movies, images, or databases. The server can be accessed by workstations or application servers through the Virtual Fileserver Network (VFN).

The term "server" highlights the role of the virtual machine in the client-server scheme, where the clients are the applications accessing the storage. The file server usually does not run application programs on behalf of the clients. It enables storage and retrieval of data, where the computation is provided by the client. With a storage area network (SAN), the server(s) act purely as virtual storage devices, with a client maintaining the file system. With network-attached storage (NAS), the server(s) manage the file system. Both SAN and NAS servers may be virtualized, so the users do not have to know which physical devices are hosting the files. A virtual file server typically combines the security of virtual private networks (VPN) with file synchronization, distribution and sharing services of network file servers.

Various companies offer software for use by an organization in managing virtual file servers. The operating system may be stripped-down, concerned only with file management functions such as synchronizing redundant copies of the file, failure recovery, handling concurrent updates from different clients and enforcing client access rights. Some companies offer virtual file servers as a service to organizations that prefer to outsource server operations, with the servers residing in the "cloud".

== See also ==
- Storage virtualization
- Storage area network
- Network-attached storage
- Virtual private network
- Platform as a service
