= Pillar Data Systems =

- Type: Private
- Industry: Data Storage
- Founded: 2001
- Defunct: July 18, 2011
- Fate: Acquired by Oracle
- Successor: Oracle Corporation
- Headquarters: San Jose, California
- Key people: Mike Workman, CEO
- Products: Axiom 600, Axiom 600e, AxiomOne
- Number of employees: 325
- Website: www.pillardata.com

Pillar Data Systems, a computer data storage company headquartered in San Jose, California, developed midrange and enterprise network storage systems. Pillar Data employed 325 people and sold its products to organizations in the financial services, healthcare, government and legal industries. Its primary product-offering was the Axiom platform.

== History ==
Formerly Digital Appliance Storage Systems Israel, Pillar Data Systems was created in July 2001 with funding from Tako Ventures, LLC, the venture arm of Larry Ellison, founder and CEO of Oracle Corporation. University of California Berkeley and Stanford University alumnus Mike Workman founded and later became CEO and chairman of the company. By 2005, it had over $150 million in financing.

The Pillar Axiom product integrated storage area networks (SAN) and network-attached storage (NAS), supporting management of tiered storage on one platform. Axiom supported any combination of iSCSI SAN, Fibre Channel SAN or Network File System (NFS) NAS. Pillar also offered products for Microsoft Exchange Server, Oracle Database, OracleVM, and VMware data.

Pillar directly competed against EMC Corporation, Hitachi Data Systems, NetApp, 3PAR, Isilon, Coraid, BlueArc and Compellent Technologies in the midrange-storage hardware-industry. Pillar had partnerships with Symantec, FalconStor, and Data Domain for data de-duplication. Pillar also had partnerships with Oracle Corporation and with VMware.

Oracle announced on June 29, 2011, that it would acquire Pillar Data. The acquisition was done with no up-front payment, since Pillar owed Ellison and his affiliates $544 million. The press noted that Workman did not appear at the announcement event. The acquisition took effect on July 18, 2011.
