= Buffer credits =

Buffer credits, also called buffer-to-buffer credits (BBC) are used as a flow control method by Fibre Channel technology and represent the number of frames a port can store.

Each time a port transmits a frame that port's BB Credit is decremented by one; for each R_RDY received, that port's BB Credit is incremented by one. If the BB Credit is zero the corresponding node cannot transmit until an R_RDY is received back.

The benefits of a large data buffer are particularly evident in long-distance applications, when operating at higher data rates (2 Gbit/s, 4 Gbit/s), or in systems with a heavily loaded PCI bus.

== See also ==
- Fibre Channel
- Host adapter
