= Storage management =

Storage management usually refers to the management of computer data storage, which includes memory management. It can also refer to specific methods or products for storage management, such as the following:

- ADSTAR Distributed Storage Manager
- Automatic Storage Management
- Hierarchical storage management
- IBM Tivoli Storage Manager
- OpenView Storage Area Manager
- Storage Management Initiative - Specification
- Storage Resource Manager
- Storage Resource Management
