= Fabric Application Interface Standard =

API framework for SANs

ANSI INCITS 432-2007: Information technology - Fabric Application Interface Standard or FAIS is an application programming interface framework for implementing storage applications in a storage area network. FAIS is defined by Technical Committee T11 of the International Committee for Information Technology Standards.

It provides a high-speed, highly reliable device for performing fabric-based services throughout heterogeneous data center environments. Furthermore, it describes extensions to the Fibre Channel specification, specifically regarding Fibre Channel over 4-pair twisted pair cabling as described in ISO/IEC 11801.
