= Storage Resource Manager =

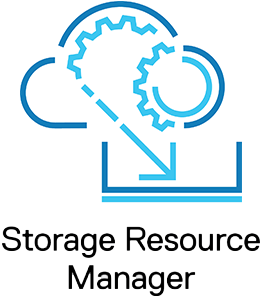
The logo for SRM.

Storage resource manager is a storage resource management (SRM) tool by the Scientific Data Management Group at Lawrence Berkeley National Laboratory (LBNL). This group is part of the Computational Research Division at LBNL and focuses on developing technologies for efficient data access, storage, analysis, and the management of massive scientific datasets. It is also a suite of software solutions developed to address the needs of managing large datasets across various storage systems.

The SRM Middleware Project, specifically, provides tools for dynamic storage management which helps prevent data loss, and ensures the efficient handling of large volumes of data. This project is part of an international collaboration that includes CERN, DESY, FNAL, ICTO, INFN, LBNL, RAL, TJNAF

The SRM Working Group is an international collaboration that has been involved in creating specifications for SRM, detailing its functionality and interface design.

The SRM specifications have evolved, with the current version being SRM v2.2, which was revised with minor changes in 2009. These specifications have formed a standardized approach to storage resource management across different platforms.

== See also ==
- List of SAN network management systems
