= FATA (hard disk drive) =

Fibre Attached Technology Adapted (FATA) or FC-ATA is a type of computer hard disk drive. FATA is simply a low cost ATA or SATA disk drive equipped with a small external converter that bridges the interface to Fibre Channel (FC). This allows users to use the disk in an enterprise-class disk enclosure, at about half of the cost of a native FC drive (cost per gigabyte of capacity).

== See also ==
- ATA over Ethernet (AoE)
- Fibre Channel over Ethernet (FCoE)
