= Infortrend =

Infortrend Technology 普安科技
- Traded as: Public (TSEC: 2495)
- Industry: Computer Systems; Storage Systems
- Founded: Taipei, Taiwan (1993)
- Headquarters: New Taipei, Taiwan
- Area served: Worldwide
- Products: EonStor GS, EonStor GSe, EonStor GSe Pro, EonStor DS
- Number of employees: ~600
- Website: www.infortrend.com

Infortrend Technology (Chinese: 普安科技; pinyin: Pǔān Kējì) is a Taiwanese technology company specializing in SAN and NAS storage systems. The company is headquartered in the Zhonghe District of New Taipei, Taiwan, and has regional headquarters in Tokyo, Sunnyvale, California, Beijing, and Munich.

== History ==
Infortrend was founded in 1993 in Taiwan, initially focusing on RAID controllers. The company gradually expanded its focus to include full RAID storage arrays.

In 2003 it started to ship its own-branded products when it launched the EonStor product series. Since then, its own-branded business has continued to grow, including product lines such as EonStor DS, ESVA and EonNAS.

Infortrend launched the world's first 8 Gbit/s Fibre Channel-host (FC-host) RAID array, the world's first 16 Gbit/s FC-host RAID array, 2.5"-drive RAID array, SAS-drive RAID array and SATA-drive RAID array.

Infortrend was listed on the Taiwan Stock Exchange in 2002.

== Products ==
The company's main product families include EonStor GS, EonStor GSe, EonStor GSe Pro and EonStor DS.

== See also ==
- List of companies of Taiwan
