= Fibre Channel Protocol =

High-speed data transfer standard

Fibre Channel Protocol (FCP) is the SCSI interface protocol utilising an underlying Fibre Channel connection. The Fibre Channel standards define a high-speed data transfer mechanism that can be used to connect workstations, mainframes, supercomputers, storage devices and displays. FCP addresses the need for very fast transfers of large volumes of information and could relieve system manufacturers from the burden of supporting a variety of channels and networks, as it provides one standard for networking, storage and data transfer.

Some Fibre Channel characteristics are:

- Performance from 266 megabits/second to 112 gigabits/second (128GFC)
- Support both optical and copper media, with distances up to 10 km.
- Small connectors (SFP+ are most common)
- High-bandwidth utilisation with distance insensitivity
- Support for multiple cost/performance levels, from small systems to supercomputers
- Ability to carry multiple existing interface command sets, including Internet Protocol (IP), SCSI, IPI, HIPPI-FP, and audio/video.

Fibre Channel consists of the following layers:

- FC-0 -- The interface to the physical media
- FC-1 -- The encoding and decoding of data and out-of-band physical link control information for transmission over the physical media
- FC-2 -- The transfer of frames, sequences and exchanges comprising protocol information units.
- FC-3 -- Common services required for advanced features such as striping, hunt group and multicast.
- FC-4 -- Application interfaces that can execute over Fibre Channel such as the Fibre Channel Protocol for SCSI (FCS).

Unlike a layered network architecture, a Fibre Channel network is largely specified by functional elements and the interfaces between them. These consist, in part, of the following:

- N_PORTs—The end points for traffic.
- FC Devices—The devices to which the N_PORTs provide access.
- Fabric Ports—The interfaces within a network that provide attachment for an N_PORT.
- The network infrastructure for carrying frame traffic between N_PORTs.
- Within a switched or mixed fabric, a set of auxiliary servers, including a name server for device discovery and network address resolution.

Fibre Channel network topologies consist of the following:

- Arbitrated Loop—A series of N_PORTs connected together in daisy-chain fashion.
- Switched Fabric—A network consisting of switching elements.
- Mixed Fabric—A network consisting of switches and "fabric-attached" loops. A loop-attached N_PORT (NL_PORT) is connected to the loop through an L_PORT and accesses the fabric by way of an FL_PORT.

== See also ==
- Fibre Channel frame
