= Disk array =

Disk storage system

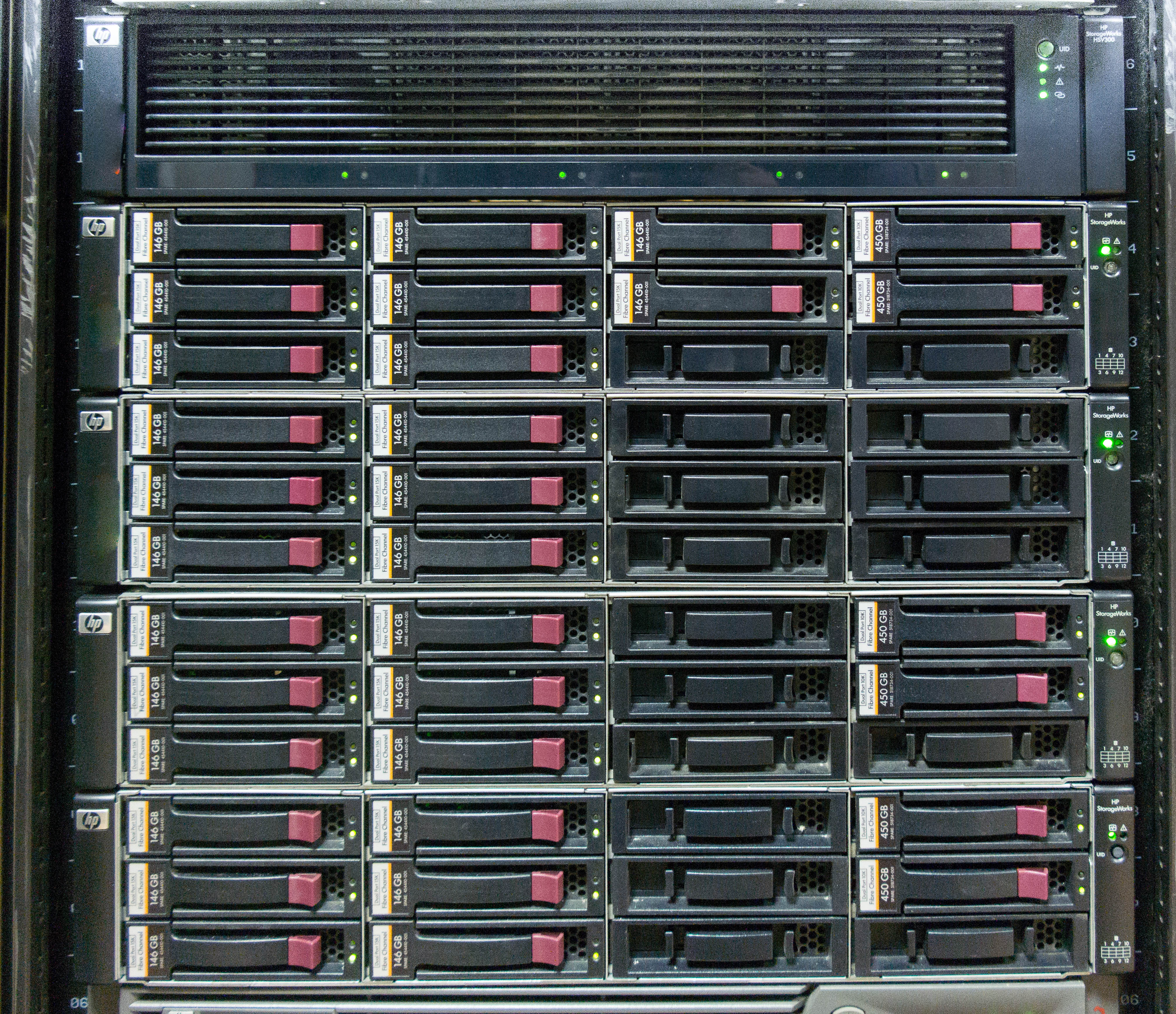
HP EVA4400 storage array, consisting of 2U controller enclosure (top) and 4 2U disk shelves

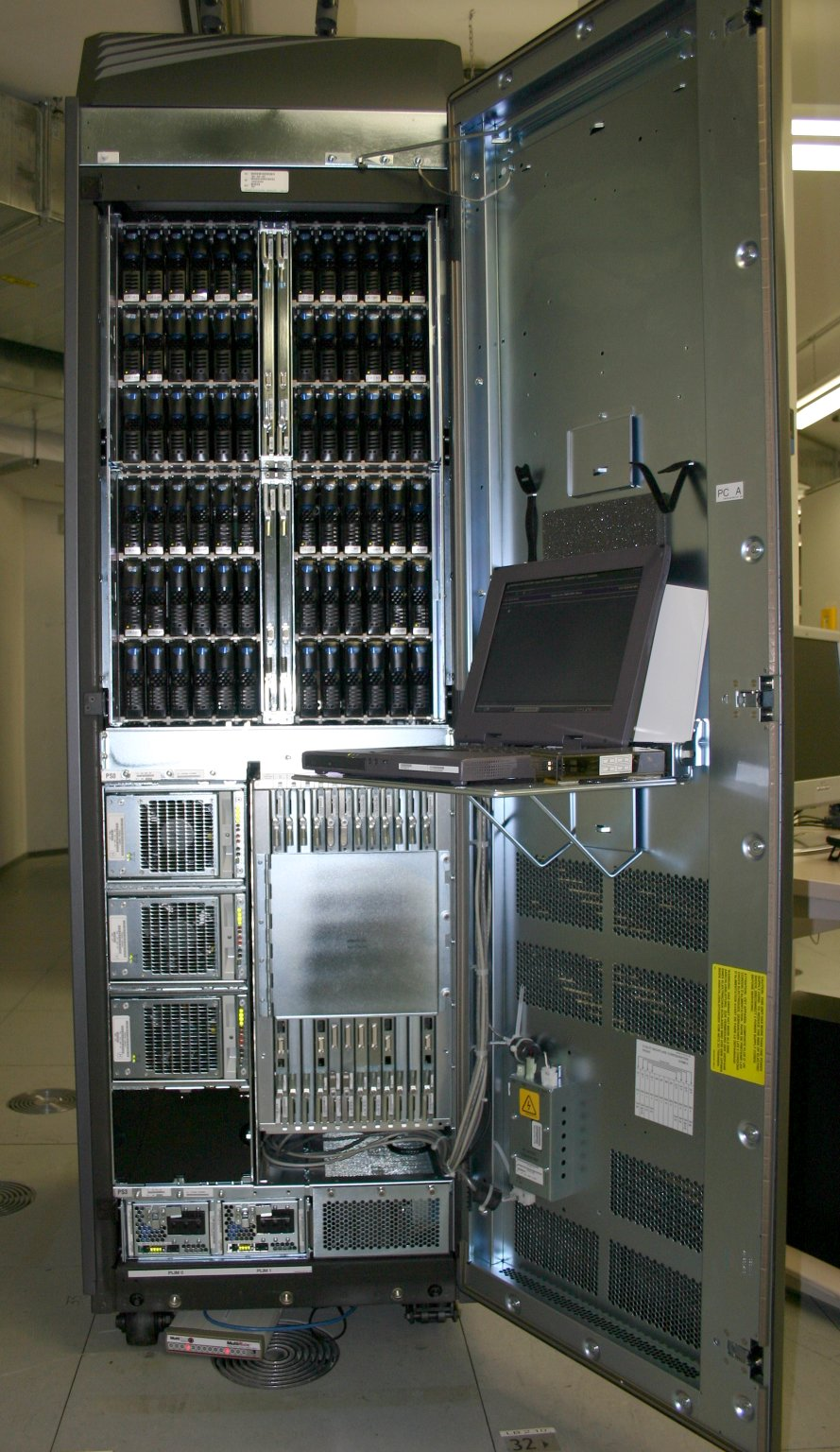
EMC Symmetrix DMX1000

A disk array is a disk storage system which contains multiple disk drives. It is differentiated from a disk enclosure, in that an array has cache memory and advanced functionality, like RAID, deduplication, encryption and virtualization.

Components of a disk array include:

- Disk array controllers
- Cache in form of both volatile random-access memory and non-volatile flash memory.
- Disk enclosures for both magnetic rotational hard disk drives and electronic solid-state drives.
- Power supplies

Typically a disk array provides increased availability, resiliency, and maintainability by using additional redundant components (controllers, power supplies, fans, etc.), often up to the point where all single points of failure (SPOFs) are eliminated from the design. Additionally, disk array components are often hot-swappable.

Traditionally disk arrays were divided into categories:

- Network attached storage (NAS) arrays
- Storage area network (SAN) arrays:
  - Modular SAN arrays
  - Monolithic SAN arrays
  - Utility Storage Arrays
- Storage virtualization

Primary vendors of storage systems include Coraid, Inc., DataDirect Networks, Dell EMC, Fujitsu, Hewlett Packard Enterprise, Hitachi Data Systems, Huawei, IBM, Infortrend, NetApp, Oracle Corporation, Pure Storage and other companies that often act as OEM for the above vendors and do not themselves market the storage components they manufacture.
