= Fibre Channel over IP =

Internet protocol

Fibre Channel over IP (FCIP or FC/IP, also known as Fibre Channel tunneling or storage tunneling) is a protocol created by the Internet Engineering Task Force (IETF) for storage technology.

An FCIP entity encapsulates Fibre Channel frames using TCP segments and forwards them over an IP network to another FCIP entity which decapsulates them and restores the original FC frames. From the perspective of the IP stack, FCIP runs in the application layer. From the perspective of the FC stack, FCIP provides services of the Fibre Channel Framing and Flow Control Layer (FC-2).

FCIP technology overcomes the distance limitations of native Fibre Channel, enabling geographically distributed storage area networks to be connected using existing IP infrastructure, while keeping fabric services intact. The Fibre Channel Fabric and its devices remain unaware of the presence of the IP Network.

== Similar protocols ==
A competing technology to FCIP is known as iFCP. It uses routing instead of tunneling to enable connectivity of Fibre Channel networks over IP.

== See also ==
- IP over Fibre Channel (IPFC)
- Internet Fibre Channel Protocol (iFCP)
- Internet SCSI (iSCSI)
- Fibre Channel over Ethernet
