= List of storage area network management systems =

This is a list of Storage area network (SAN) management systems. A storage area network is a dedicated network that provides access to consolidated, block level data storage.

== Systems ==
- Brocade Network Advisor
- Cisco Fabric Manager
- Enterprise Fabric Connectivity (EFC) Manager
- EMC ControlCenter
- EMC VisualSRM
- EMC Invista
- Hitachi Data Systems HiCommand
- HP OpenView Storage Area Manager
- IBM SAN Volume Controller
- Symantec Veritas Command Central Storage
- KernSafe Cross-Platform iSCSI SAN
