= Network block device =

Network storage protocol

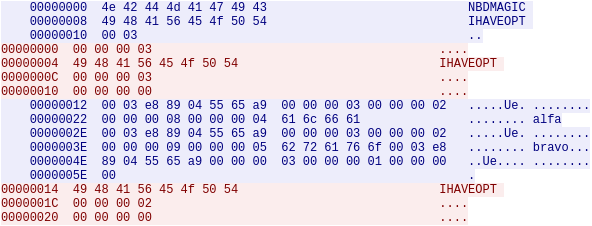
Hexdump of the Initialization / Handshake between a Network Block Device client and server

On Linux, network block device (NBD) is a network protocol that can be used to forward a block device (typically a hard disk or partition) from one machine to a second machine. As an example, a local machine can access a hard disk drive that is attached to another computer.

== Overview ==
The protocol was originally developed for Linux 2.1.55 and released in 1997. In 2011 the protocol was revised, formally documented, and is now developed as a collaborative open standard. There are several interoperable clients and servers.

There are Linux-compatible NBD implementations for FreeBSD and other operating systems. The term 'network block device' is sometimes also used generically.

Technically, a network block device is realized by three components: the server part, the client part, and the network between them. On the client machine, which uses the exported device node, a kernel driver implements a virtual device. Whenever a program tries to access the device, the kernel driver forwards the request (if the client part is not fully implemented in the kernel it can be done with help of a userspace program) to the server machine, on which the data reside physically. On the server machine, requests from the client are handled by a userspace program.

Network block device servers are typically implemented as a userspace program running on a general-purpose computer. All of the function specific to network block device servers can reside in a userspace process because the process communicates with the client via conventional sockets and accesses the storage via a conventional file system interface.

The network block device client module is available on Unix-like operating systems, including Linux.

== Alternative protocols ==
- iSCSI: The "target-utils" iscsi package on many Linux distributions.
- NVMe-oF: an equivalent mechanism, exposing block devices as NVMe namespaces over TCP, Fibre Channel, RDMA, &c., native to most operating systems
- Loop device: a similar mechanism, but uses a local file instead of a remote one
- DRBD: Distributed Replicated Block Device is a distributed storage system for the Linux platform
- ATA over Ethernet: send ATA commands over Ethernet
- USB/IP: A protocol that provides network access to USB devices via IP.
