= List of Fibre Channel network protocols =

Fibre Channel network protocols are used for communication between devices in a Fibre Channel network.

== Transmission words and ordered sets ==
All Fibre Channel communication is done in units of four 10-bit codes. This group of 4 codes is called a transmission word.

An ordered set is a transmission word that includes some combination of control (K) codes and data (D) codes.

== AL_PAs ==
Each device has an Arbitrated Loop Physical Address (AL_PA). These addresses are defined by an 8-bit field but must have neutral disparity as defined in the 8b/10b coding scheme. That reduces the number of possible values from 256 to 134. The 134 possible values have been divided between the fabric, FC_AL ports, and other special purposes as follows:

AL_PA	Quantity	Purpose
00	1	FL (fabric) port
01-7E	126	NL (normal) ports
F0	1	Used during LIP and ARB
F7	1	Used during LIP
F8	1	Used during LIP
F9-FE	3	Reserved
FF	1	Used for broadcasts

== Meta-data ==
In addition to the transfer of data, it is necessary for Fibre Channel communication to include some metadata. This allows for the setting up of links, sequence management, and other control functions. The meta-data falls into two types, primitives which consist of a 4 character transmission word and non-data frames which are more complex structures.

== Primitives ==
All primitives are four characters in length. They begin with the control character K28.5, followed by three data characters. In some primitives the three data characters are fixed, in others they can be varied to change the meaning or to act as parameters for the primitive. In some cases the last two parameter characters are identical.

Parameters are shown in the table below in the form of their hexadecimal 8-bit values. This is clearer than their full 10-bit (Dxx.x) form as shown in the Fibre Channel standards:

Mnemonic	Meaning	Parameters	Comments
ARB	Arbitrate	94F0F0	Request fairness
ARB	Arbitrate	94FFFF	Fill word
ARB	Arbitrate	94yyyy	Request arbitration for AL_PA=yy
CLS	Close	85B5B5	Ends communication, cancelling previous OPN commands.
DHD	Dynamic Half-Duplex	8AB5B5	
EOF	End of frame	See note 1	
IDLE	Idle	95B5B5	
LIP	Loop Initialization	15F7F7	Request AL_PA
LIP	Loop Initialization	15F7xx	Reinitialise AL_PA=xx
LIP	Loop Initialization	15F8F7	Loop failure at unknown AL_PA
LIP	Loop Initialization	15F8xx	Loop failure at AL_PA=xx
LIP	Loop Initialization	15FFxx	Reset all, originating AL_PA=xx
LIP	Loop Initialization	15yyxx	Reset AL_PA=yy, originating AL_PA=xx
LPB	Loop Port Bypass	09yyxx	Bypass AL_PA=yy, originating AL_PA=xx
LPB	Loop Port Bypass	09FFxx	Bypass all, originating AL_PA=xx
LPE	Loop Port Enable	05yyxx	Enable AL_PA=yy, originating AL_PA=xx
LPE	Loop Port Enable	05FFxx	Enable all, originating AL_PA=xx
LR	Link Reset	49BF49	
LRR	Link Reset Response	35BF49	
MRK	Mark	5Fxxxx	Vendor unique - clock sync, spindle sync etc.
NOS	Not Operational	55BF45	Link has failed
OLS	Offline	358A55	Going offline (due to received NOS or other event)
OPN	Open	91FFFF	Open broadcast replicate (see note 2)
OPN	Open	91yyFF	Open selective replicate (see note 2)
OPN	Open	91yyxx	Open full duplex between AL_PA=xx and AL_PA=yy
OPN	Open	91yyyy	Open half duplex to AL_PA=yy
R_RDY	Receiver_Ready	954949	
SOF	Start of frame	B5cccc	See note 3
SYN	Synchronise	7Fxxxx	Clock Synchronization word X
SYN	Synchronise	BFyyyy	Clock Synchronization word Y
SYN	Synchronise	DFzzzz	Clock Synchronization word Z
VC_RDY	Virtual Circuit Ready	F5vvvv	Where vv is the virtual circuit ID

Note 1: The first parameter byte of the EOF primitive can have one of four different values (8A, 95, AA, or B5). This is done so that the EOF primitive can rebalance the disparity of the whole frame. The remaining two parameter bytes define whether the frame is ending normally, terminating the transfer, or is to be aborted due to an error.

Note 2: The Open selective replicate variant can be repeated a number of times in order to communicate with more than one destination port simultaneously. The Open broadcast replicate variant will allow communication with all ports simultaneously.

Note 3: The SOF primitive contains a pair of control bytes (shown as cccc in the table) to designate the type of frame.

== Frames ==
The Fibre Channel protocol transmits data in frames each of which can contain up to 2112 bytes of payload data. The structure of a frame is shown in this table:

Field	Length
SOF - Start Of Frame	4
Extended header(s)	0 or more
Routing Control	1
Destination ID	3
Class-Specific Control / Priority	1
Source ID	3
Data Structure Type	1
Frame Control	3
Sequence ID	1
Data Field Control	1
Sequence Count	2
Originator Exchange ID	2
Responder Exchange ID	2
Parameter	4
Data field	0 to 2112
CRC - cyclic redundancy check	4
EOF - End of Frame	4

In addition to data frames, there are non-data frames that are used for setup and messaging purposes. These fall into three categories: link control frames, link service frames, and extended link service frames. The following table lists the most common ones:

Mnemonic	Frame type	Meaning
ABTS	Link service	Abort Sequence
ACK	Link control	Acknowledge data frame (success)
BA_ACC	Link service	Basic accept
BA_RJT	Link service	Basic reject
F_BSY	Link control	Fabric busy
F_RJT	Link control	Fabric frame reject
FLOGI	Extended link service	Fabric login
NOP	Link service	No Operation
P_BSY	Link control	Port busy
P_RJT	Link control	Port frame reject
PLOGI	Extended link service	Port login
PRLI	Extended link service	Process login
PRLO	Extended link service	Process logout
PRMT	Link service	Dedicated connection preempted
RMC	Link service	Remove connection
RSI	Extended link service	Request sequence initiative
