= Silk Technologies =

American cloud storage company

Silk
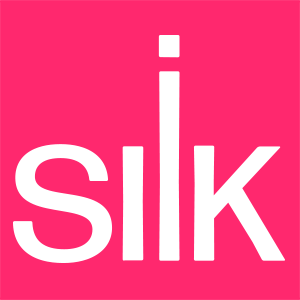
- Type: Private
- Founded: 2008; 18 years ago
- Headquarters: Needham, Massachusetts, United States
- Key people: Dani Golan (Founder, CEO)
- Products: Silk Platform
- Website: www.silk.us

Silk is a software company specializing in software-defined cloud storage. The company provides a platform designed to optimize the performance, scalability, and cost-efficiency of cloud storage, catering to enterprise applications and workloads, including artificial intelligence (AI) and machine learning (ML).

The company is headquartered in Needham, Massachusetts, with additional operations in Israel.

== History ==
CEO Dani Golan founded Silk in 2008. Originally called Kaminario, after the Japanese god of lightning, the company was a flash storage start-up.

The company's first venture capital funding round was announced in May 2011 with a $15 million investment from Globespan Capital Partners, Sequoia Capital, and Pitango Venture Capital. Silk received $25 million in series D funding in June 2012 from Tenaya Capital and existing investors. In December 2014 and January 2015, the company announced $68 million in a series E round from Lazarus Hedge Fund, Silicon Valley Bank, Mitsui & Co. Global Investment, and existing investors.

In 2017, the company evolved to focus purely on storage software in a Storage as a Service model. It partnered with Tech Data to offer customers inexpensive hardware to run their storage software on.

In 2020, the company rebranded itself as Silk.

In January 2025, Silk secured $30M in growth capital from Trinity Capital to support expansion in finance, healthcare, insurance, and retail: the investment specifically emphasized Silk's ability to serve AI data needs.

== Products and Features ==
=== Silk Echo ===
Silk Echo is a copy data management featured aimed at supporting real-time AI workflows. It was launched in February 2025 and allows data teams to provision new database environments for testing, analytics, and AI model development without impacting live systems.
