= Internet Fibre Channel Protocol =

Internet Fibre Channel Protocol (iFCP) is a gateway-to-gateway network protocol standard that provides Fibre Channel fabric functionality to Fibre Channel devices over an IP network. It is officially ratified by the Internet Engineering Task Force. Its most common forms are in 1 Gbit/s, 2 Gbit/s, 4 Gbit/s, 8 Gbit/s, and 10 Gbit/s, a shortened version of Gigabits per second also known as 1,000 megabits per second.

== Technical overview ==
The iFCP protocol enables the implementation of Fibre Channel functionality over an IP network, within which the Fibre Channel switching and routing infrastructure is replaced by IP components and technology. Congestion control, error detection and recovery are provided through the use of TCP (Transmission Control Protocol). The primary objective of iFCP is to allow existing Fibre Channel devices to be networked and interconnected over an IP based network at wire speeds.

The method of address translation defined and the protocol permit Fibre Channel storage devices and host adapters to be attached to an IP-based fabric using transparent gateways.

The iFCP protocol layer's main function is to transport Fibre Channel frame images between Fibre Channel ports attached both locally and remotely. iFCP encapsulates and routes the fibre channel frames that make up each Fibre Channel information unit via a predetermined TCP connection for transport across the IP network when transporting frames to a remote Fibre Channel port.

== See also ==
- Fibre Channel over Ethernet (FCoE)
- Fibre Channel over IP (FCIP)
- Internet SCSI (iSCSI)
