= Arbitrated loop =

Fibre Channel

Layer 4. Protocol mapping
- LUN masking

Layer 3. Common services

Layer 2. Network
- Fibre Channel fabric Fibre Channel zoning Registered state change notification

Layer 1. Data link
- Fibre Channel 8b/10b encoding

Layer 0. Physical

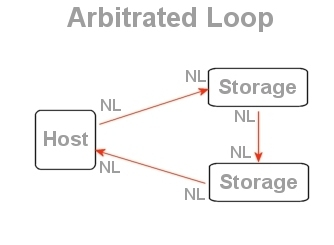

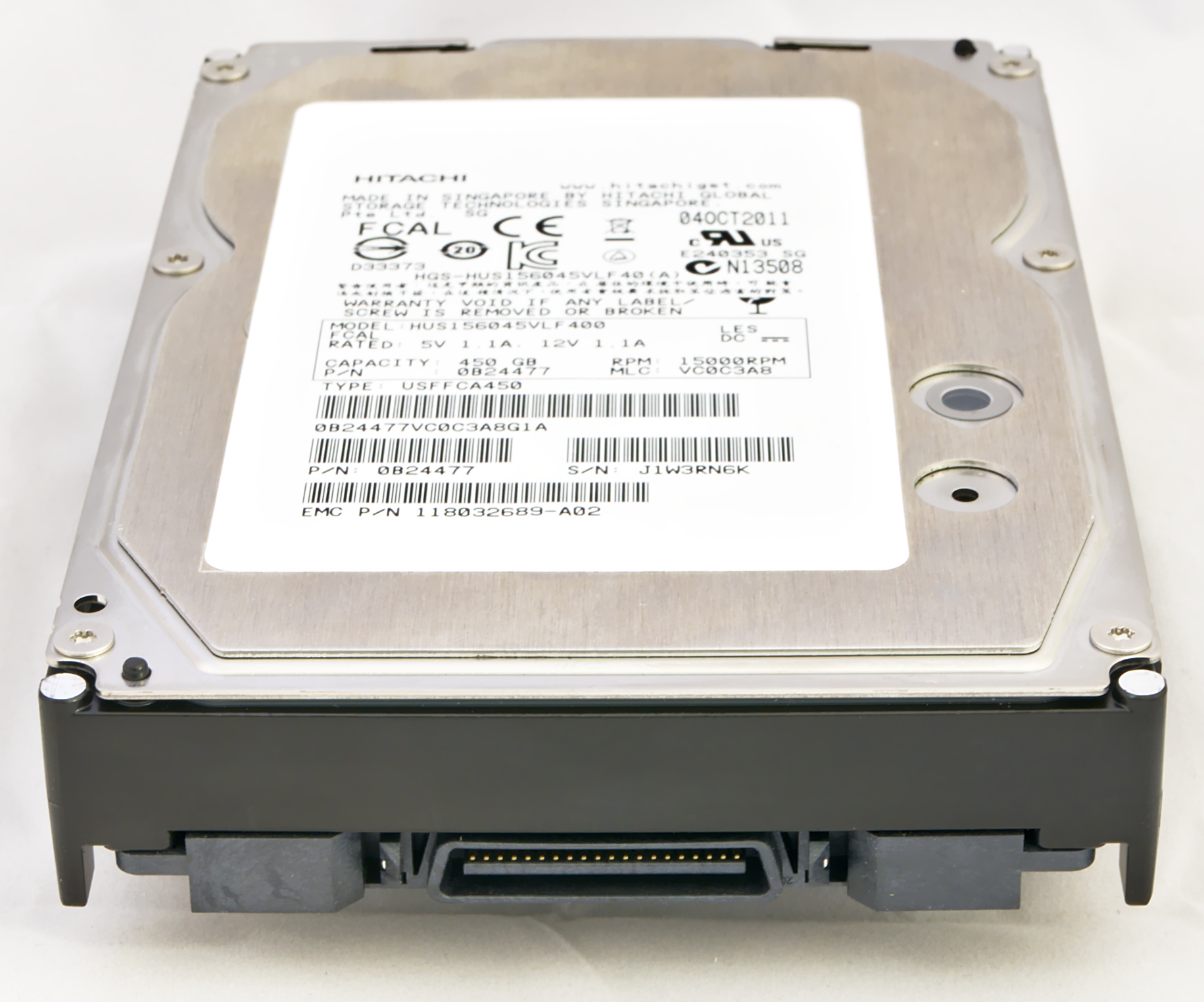
FC-AL drive with SCA-2 connector.

The arbitrated loop, also known as FC-AL, is a Fibre Channel topology in which devices are connected in a one-way loop fashion in a ring topology. Historically it was a lower-cost alternative to a fabric topology. It allowed connection of many servers and computer storage devices without using then very costly Fibre Channel switches. The cost of the switches dropped considerably, so by 2007, FC-AL had become rare in server-to-storage communication. It is however still common within storage systems.

- It is a serial architecture that can be used as the transport layer in a SCSI network, with up to 127 devices. The loop may connect into a fibre channel fabric via one of its ports.
- The bandwidth on the loop is shared among all ports.
- Only two ports may communicate at a time on the loop. One port wins arbitration and may open one other port in either half or full duplex mode.
- A loop with two ports is valid and has the same physical topology as point-to-point, but still acts as a loop protocol-wise.
- Fibre Channel ports capable of arbitrated loop communication are NL_port (node loop port) and FL_port (fabric loop port), collectively referred to as the L_ports. The ports may attach to each other via a hub, with cables running from the hub to the ports. The physical connectors on the hub are not ports in terms of the protocol. A hub does not contain ports.
- An arbitrated loop with no fabric port (with only NL_ports) is a private loop.
- An arbitrated loop connected to a fabric (through an FL_port) is a public loop.
- An NL_Port must provide fabric logon (FLOGI) and name registration facilities to initiate communication with other node through the fabric (to be an initiator).

Arbitrated loop can be physically cabled in a ring fashion or using a hub. The physical ring ceases to work if one of the devices in the chain fails. The hub on the other hand, while maintaining a logical ring, allows a star topology on the cable level. Each receive port on the hub is simply passed to next active transmit port, bypassing any inactive or failed ports.

Fibre Channel hubs therefore have another function: They provide bypass circuits that prevent the loop from breaking if one device fails or is removed. If a device is removed from a loop (for example, by pulling its interconnect plug), the hub’s bypass circuit detects the absence of signal and immediately begins to route incoming data directly to the loop’s next port, bypassing the missing device entirely. This gives loops at least a measure of resiliency—failure of one device in a loop doesn’t cause the entire loop to become inoperable.

== See also ==
- Storage area network
- Fibre Channel
- Switched fabric
- List of Fibre Channel standards
