= Persistent binding =

Host-based zoning can include WWN or LUN masking, and is typically known as persistent binding.

In storage networking, persistent binding is an option of zoning.

Host-based zoning is usually referred to as persistent binding or LUN mapping and is perhaps the least implemented form of zoning. Because it requires the host configuration to be correct in order to avoid zoning conflicts, this form of zoning creates a greater opportunity for administrative errors and conflicting access to targets. Moreover, zoning interfaces vary among different host operating systems and HBA's — increasing the possibility for administrative errors. If a host is not configured with the zoning software, it can access all devices in the fabric and create an even higher probability of data corruption. Host-based zoning is often used when clusters are implemented to control the mapping of devices to specific SCSI target IDs. However, it should never be the only form of zoning. Augmenting host-based zoning with storage- and fabric-based zoning is the only acceptable method to reliably control device access and data security.

Basically, A given LUN has it SCSI id assigned by its RAID device (typically a SAN ). But for some purposes it's useful to have the SCSI id assigned by the host itself: that's persistent binding.

== What is Persistent binding for ? ==
Without persistent binding, after every reboot, the SCSI id of a LUN may change. For example, under Linux, a LUN bound on /dev/sda could migrate to /dev/sdb after a reboot. The risks augments with multipathing. Based on that, it is obvious that many software may crash without persistent binding.

Operating systems and upper-level applications (such as backup software) typically require a static or predictable SCSI target ID for their storage reliability and persistent binding affords that happening.

== Types of zoning ==
A zone can include host and LUNS. The LUNS are exported by the DISK ARRAY, the hosts are the clients (servers, computers). Each host in a zone can access each LUNS in the same zone. That's zoning. The zone is usually set on the central point of connection of the hosts and the DISK ARRAY: the FC switch.

== LUN masking ==
from Fibre Channel zoning

Zoning is sometimes confused with LUN masking, because it serves the same goals. LUN masking, however, works on Fibre channel level 4 (i.e. on SCSI level), while zoning works on level 2. This allows zoning to be implemented on switches, whereas LUN masking is performed on endpoint devices - host adapters or disk array controllers.

Some fibre channel switches allow zoning at the LUN level, effectively implementing LUN masking at the switch.

Here, we are talking about level 4.

This form of zoning has to be augmented by another zoning : RAID ARRAY based or fabric-based(FC switch) to improve security and avoid any errors. Otherwise two hosts may access the same data(LUNS) at the same time and it will result in data corruption. Persistent binding is often used in a cluster environment, to associate a LUN with a persistent SCSI id and device (example /dev/sda)
