= Fibre Channel switch =

Hardware device for Fibre Channel networks

Fibre Channel

Layer 4. Protocol mapping
- LUN masking

Layer 3. Common services

Layer 2. Network
- Fibre Channel fabric Fibre Channel zoning Registered state change notification

Layer 1. Data link
- 8b/10b encoding

Layer 0. Physical

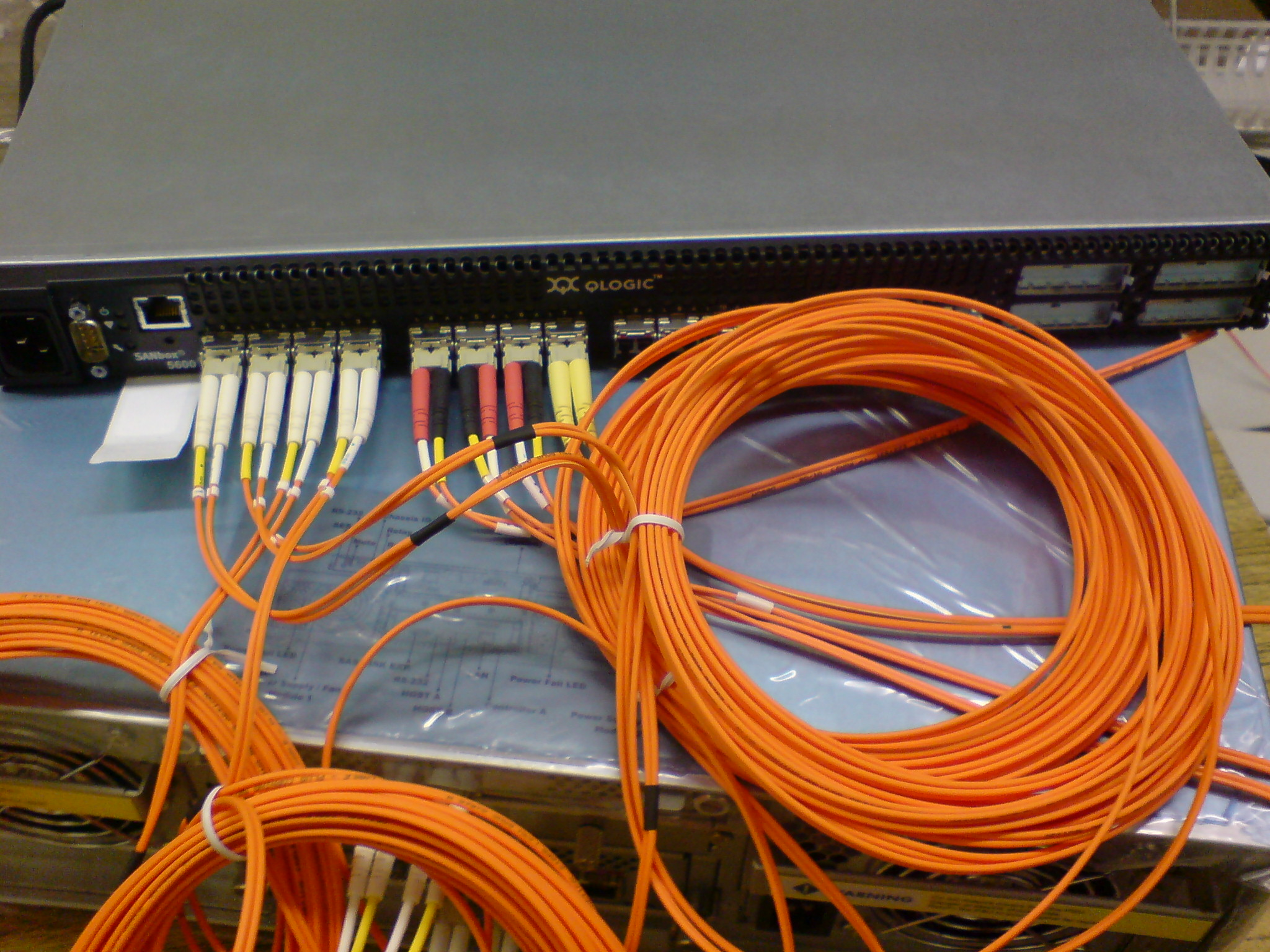
SAN-switch Qlogic with optical Fibre Channel connectors installed

In the computer storage field, a Fibre Channel switch is a network switch compatible with the Fibre Channel (FC) protocol. It allows the creation of a Fibre Channel fabric, that is the core component of a storage area network (SAN). The fabric is a network of Fibre Channel devices which allows many-to-many communication, device name lookup, security, and redundancy. FC switches implement zoning, a mechanism that disables unwanted traffic between certain fabric nodes.

Fibre Channel switches may be deployed one at a time or in larger multi-switch configurations. SAN administrators typically add new switches as their server and storage needs grow, connecting switches together via fiber optic cable using the standard device ports. Some switch vendors offer dedicated high-speed stacking ports to handle inter-switch connections (similar to existing stackable Ethernet switches), allowing high-performance multi-switch configurations to be created using fewer switches overall.

Major manufacturers of Fibre Channel switches include Brocade Communications Systems (now part of Broadcom), Cisco Systems, and QLogic (acquired by Cavium, now part of Marvell Technology Group).

== Fibre Channel Director ==
A special variety of a FC switch is the Fibre Channel Director, a switch meant to provide backbone infrastructure in a fabric usually featuring at least 128 ports and high-availability attributes, however the term is loose and varies among to manufacturers. It does not differ from a switch in core FC protocol functionality. The director term itself is derived from legacy ESCON Directors such as the IBM 9032-005.

== See also ==
- List of Fibre Channel switches
- Host Bus Adapter (HBA)
