= WWPN =

WWPN may refer to:

- World Wide Port Name, in Fibre Channel storage networking technology
- WWPN (FM), an FM radio station licensed to Westernport, Maryland
