= List of Fibre Channel standards =

== Fibre Channel ==
2005

- FC-SATA (under development)
- FC-PI-2 INCITS 404

2004

- FC-SP ANSI INCITS 1570-D
- FC-GS-4 (Fibre Channel Generic Services)ANSI INCITS 387. Includes the following standards:
  - FC-GS-2 ANSI INCITS 288 (1999)
  - FC-GS-3 ANSI INCITS 348 (2001)
- FC-SW-3 INCITS 384. Includes the following standards:
  - FC-SW INCITS 321 (1998)
  - FC-SW-2 INCITS 355 (2001)
- FC-DA INCITS TR-36. Includes the following standards:
  - FC-FLA INCITS TR-20 (1998)
  - FC-PLDA INCITS TR-19 (1998)

2003

- FC-FS INCITS 373. Includes the following standards:
  - FC-PH ANSI X3.230 (1994)
  - FC-PH-2 ANSI X3.297 (1997)
  - FC-PH-3 ANSI X3.303 (1998)
- FC-BB-2 INCITS 372
- FC-SB-3 INCITS 374. Replaces:
  - FC-SB ANSI X3.271 (1996)
  - FC-SB-2 INCITS 374 (2001)

2002

- FC-VI INCITS 357
- FC-MI INCITS/TR-30
- FC-PI INCITS 352

2001

- FC-SB-2 INCITS 374. Replaced by: FC-SB-3 INCITS 374 (2003)
- FC-SW-2 INCITS 355. Replaced by: FC-SW-3 INCITS 384 (2004)
- FC-GS-3 ANSI INCITS 348. Replaced by: FC-GS-4 ANSI INCITS 387 (2004)

1999

- FC-AL-2 INCITS 332
- FC-TAPE INCITS TR-24
- FC-GS-2 ANSI INCITS 288 (1999). Replaced by: FC-GS-4 ANSI INCITS 387 (2004)

1998

- FC-PH-3 ANSI X3.303. Replaced by: FC-FS INCITS 373 (2003)
- FC-FLA INCITS TR-20. Replaced by: FC-DA INCITS TR-36 (2004)
- FC-PLDA INCITS TR-19. Replaced by: FC-DA INCITS TR-36 (2004)
- FC-SW INCITS 321. Replaced by: FC-SW-3 INCITS 384 (2004)

1997

- FC-PH-2 ANSI X3.297. Replaced by: FC-FS INCITS 373

1996

- FC-SB ANSI X3.271. Replaced by: FC-SB-3 INCITS 374
- FC-AL ANSI X3.272

1994

- FC-PH ANSI X3.230. Replaced by: FC-FS INCITS 373 (2003)

Others:

- FC-LS: Fibre Channel Link Services
- FC-HBA API for Fibre Channel HBA management
- FC-GS-3 CT Fibre Channel Global Services Common Transport

== RFCs ==
- RFC 4338 - Transmission of IPv6, IPv4, and Address Resolution Protocol (ARP) Packets over Fibre Channel, 2006
  - RFC 3831 - Transmission of IPv6 Packets over Fibre Channel (Obsoleted by: RFC 4338)
  - RFC 2625 - IP and ARP over Fibre Channel (Obsoleted by: RFC 4338)
- RFC 3723 - Securing Block Storage Protocols over IP

== SNMP-related specifications ==
RFCs

- RFC 5324 - MIB for Fibre-Channel Security Protocols (FC-SP)
- RFC 4983 - Fibre Channel Registered State Change Notification (RSCN) MIB
- RFC 4936 - Fibre-Channel Zone Server MIB
- RFC 4935 - Fibre-Channel Fabric Configuration Server MIB
- RFC 4747 - The Virtual Fabrics MIB
- RFC 4626 - MIB for Fibre Channel's Fabric Shortest Path First (FSPF) Protocol
- RFC 4625 - Fibre Channel Routing Information MIB
- RFC 4439 - Fibre Channel Fabric Address Manager MIB
- RFC 4438 - Fibre-Channel Name Server MIB
- RFC 4369 - Definitions of Managed Objects for Internet Fibre Channel Protocol iFCP
- RFC 4044 - Fibre Channel Management MIB
  - RFC 2837 - Definitions of Managed Objects for the Fabric Element in Fibre Channel Standard (Obsoleted by: RFC 4044)
