= IOAT =

IOAT may refer to:

- I/O Acceleration Technology
- Internet of Autonomous Things
