= RSCN =

RSCN may refer to:

- Royal Society for the Conservation of Nature, an independent voluntary organization devoted to the conservation of Jordan's natural resources established in 1966 under the patronage of Queen Noor with the late King Hussein as Honorary President
- Registered Sick Children's Nurse, a medical title given to a United Kingdom nurse specialised in the care of children
- Registered State Change Notification, an FC network switch function
