= List of Fibre Channel switches =

Major manufacturers of Fibre Channel switches are:

- Brocade (Broadcom):
  - Switches: G630, G620, G610, 6520, 6510, 6505, 5300, 5100, VA-40FC, 5000, 4900, 2400, 2800, 3800, 3900, 4100, 300, 200E
  - Directors: DCX X6-8, DCX X6-4, DCX 8510-8, DCX 8510-4, DCX, DCX-4S, 48000, 24000, 12000
  - More complete list in Brocade Communications Systems article.
- Cisco:
  - Switches: Cisco MDS 9020, 9120, 9124, 9124e, 9134, 9140, 9148, 9216, 9216A, 9216i, 9222i, 9250i, 9148S, 914T, 9396S, 9396T
  - Nexus 5672UP, 5672UP-16G
  - Directors: Cisco MDS 9506, 9509, 9513, 9706, 9710 and 9718
- Juniper Networks (HPE):
  - Switches: QFabric QFX3500-48S4Q-ACR, QFX3008-CHASA-BASE, QFX3008-SF16Q, QFX3100-GBE-ACR
- McDATA (acquired and rebranded by Brocade, now Broadcom):
  - Switches: 3232, 4500, 4700
  - Directors: 6064, 6140, 10000
- QLogic (Marvell):
  - Switches: SANbox 5800,5802 5600, 5602 5200, 3050, 1400
  - Directors / Modular Chassis Switches: SANbox 9000
