= RFS =

RFS may refer to:

== Companies and organizations ==
- Radio Frequency Systems, a telecommunications company
- New South Wales Rural Fire Service, a volunteer-based firefighting agency in New South Wales, Australia
- Royal Forestry Society, a charitable organisation established in 1882 in Northumberland, England
- Riordan, Freeman & Spogli, a private equity firm today known as Freeman Spogli & Co.
- Rossijskij Futbol'nyj Soyuz or Russian Football Union, the governing body of football in Russia

== Computing ==
- Receive flow steering, a scaling technique for network traffic processing
- ReiserFS, a general-purpose, journaled computer file system
- Remote File System, a distributed file system developed by AT&T in the 1980

== Other uses ==
- Renewable Fuel Standard (United States), a US federal program
- The Review of Financial Studies, an academic journal
- Russian Federation Ship, an occasionally applied exonymical ship prefix for the Russian Navy that is not used by it officially
- Registered Financial Specialist, a Graduate Post Nominal designation at the American Academy of Financial Management
- Regardless of Feature Size, a term used in geometric dimensioning and tolerancing
- FK RFS, a Latvian professional association football club
- Rīgas futbola skola (RFS), a Latvian association football academy and youth club, operated by the Riga City Council and unrelated to FK RFS
