= Scalable Networking Pack =

Scalable Networking Pack (SNP) is a set of additions that adds new features to Microsoft's Windows Server 2003 Service Pack 1 or later with architectural enhancements and APIs to support the new capabilities of network acceleration and hardware-based offload technologies.

== Features ==
- TCP chimney offload – provides seamlessly integrated support for network adapters with TCP offload engines (TOE)
- Receive-side scaling – dynamically load-balances inbound network connections across multiple processors or cores
- NetDMA – enables support for advanced direct memory access technologies, such as Intel I/O Acceleration Technology (Intel I/OAT)
