= World Wide Port Name =

Unique identifier in Fibre Channel fabric

In computing, a World Wide Port Name, WWPN, or WWpN, is a World Wide Name assigned to a port in a Fibre Channel fabric. Used on storage area networks, it performs a function equivalent to the MAC address in Ethernet protocol, as it is supposed to be a unique identifier in the network.

A WWPN is a World Wide Port Name; a unique identifier for each Fibre Channel port presented to a Storage Area Network (SAN). Each port on a Storage Device has a unique and persistent WWPN.

A World Wide Node Name, WWNN, or WWnN, is a World Wide Name assigned to a node (an endpoint, a device) in a Fibre Channel fabric. It is valid for the same WWNN to be seen on many different ports (different addresses) on the network, identifying the ports as multiple network interfaces of a single network node.
