= FC-HBA API =

In computing, the FC-HBA API (also called the SNIA Common HBA API) is an Application Programming Interface for Host Bus Adapters connecting computers to hard disks via a Fibre Channel network. It was developed by the Storage Networking Industry Association and published by the T11.5 committee of INCITS An "early implementers version" was published in 2000, and the current version was completed in 2002.

According to the FAQ, "the HBA API has been overwhelmingly adopted by Storage Area Network vendors to help manage, monitor, and deploy storage area networks in an interoperable way." Vendors supply their own library (written in C) as plugins for a common HBA library.

== Operating system support ==
Windows Server 2003, AIX 5, HPUX and Solaris include support for FC-HBA API and it is being added to Linux.

== See also ==
- SM HBA
