= ATTO Technology =

Storage connectivity product manufacturer

ATTO Technology, Inc.
- Company type: Private
- Industry: Storage
- Founded: November 11, 1988; 37 years ago
- Headquarters: Amherst, New York, United States
- Key people: Tim Klein, President and CEO; David Snell, CTO and Vice President of Engineering
- Website: www.atto.com

ATTO Technology, Inc. is a manufacturer of storage connectivity products for data-intensive computing. ATTO manufactures Fibre Channel and SAS/SATA host bus adapters, Fibre Channel host bus adapters, protocol conversion bridges, storage controllers, MacOS iSCSI initiator software and acceleration software with storage interface connectivity to SATA, SAS, Fibre Channel, Thunderbolt devices, Ethernet and NVMe.

== History ==
=== 1988: Founding ===
The company was founded in 1988 by Timothy J. Klein and David A. Snell, and is headquartered in Amherst, New York.

=== 1989–95: First Products ===
SiliconDisk

The first ATTO product was the SiliconDisk, a SCSI-based solid-state disk, released in 1989. The company received its first OEM contract with Kodak shortly thereafter, in 1990. In 1992, ATTO introduced the ISA, EISA and Micro Channel (MCA) host bus adapters for the PC market at the COMDEX trade show. By 1995, ATTO added to its product line with the introduction of the ExpressPCI SCSI-3 Accelerator, which received the MacUsers Editor's Choice award that year.

=== 1996–2008: New Technologies ===
ATTO released its Fibre Channel host bus adapters, bridges and hubs in 1996. In 1999, it introduced its first enterprise-class ATA-based RAID storage array. In 2002, the company released the iPBridge, an iSCSI to SCSI bridge. In the early 2000s, ATTO started a focus on the Fibre Channel market, developing and releasing the Celerity line of Fibre Channel host bus adapters in 2003 with 1 GB connectivity. By 2005, ATTO expanded its Celerity offerings with the 4 GB host bus adapters, as well as introducing the FibreBridge storage controller for data centers and the FastStream Fibre Channel RAID controllers. In 2007, ATTO stepped into the SAS/SATA market with ExpressSAS RAID and host bus adapters. The following year, ATTO released 8 GB Fibre Channel and 6Gb ExpressSAS adapters, and in 2009 the company rolled out the first 8 GB Fibre Channel storage controller. ATTO introduced its FibreConnect family of switches in 2010 and introduced a revised product in 2012, providing scalable, end-to-end SAN connectivity. In 2011, ATTO released its first FastFrame network interface cards and converged network adapters, enabling connectivity to Ethernet networks. In 2012, ATTO introduced its ThunderLink and ThunderStream devices, the company's first Thunderbolt enabled products.

=== 2015–Present: New Developments ===
By 2015, ATTO had expanded its FastFrame offering to include both 10 GB and 40 GB Ethernet connectivity, in single-, dual- and quad-port configurations. The following year, 2016, was a banner year for ATTO, introducing both 32 GB and 16 GB Gen 6 Celerity host bus adapters and debuted the renamed XstreamCORE storage controller, replacing all but a few of its Fibre Channel storage controllers. At the same time, ATTO's ExpressNAV software was rebranded as XstreamVIEW. ThunderLink and ThunderStream Thunderbolt connectivity devices now support Thunderbolt 2 and Thunderbolt 3 platforms and provide connectivity to 6 GB SAS/SATA RAID, Fibre Channel and 10 GB Ethernet networks. Thunderbolt 3 to 40 GB Ethernet and both 32 GB and 16 GB Fibre Channel products were also introduced.

=== Architecture ===
With the introduction of XstreamCORE, ATTO launched two new technologies to help their products stand out against competing architectures. xCORE IO Acceleration features multiple parallel IO acceleration engines with end-to-end IO processing, hardware buffer allocation management and real-time performance and latency analytics. These features combine to provide very high, reliable throughput and IOPS with deterministic latency of under 4 microseconds. Unlike general purpose processor based architectures xCORE maintains performance and latency as services and features are added. This is accomplished with the help of ATTO's other new technology the eCORE Control Engine. The eCORE offloads non-data related commands from xCORE and adds common, open storage services, integrates with industry standard APIs, manages reservations, storage routing and host and mapping functions. The eCORE Control Engine also manages traffic for data mover offload with added error handling and diagnostic tools. These features add value to JBOD (Just a Bunch of Disks/Drives), JBOF (Just a Bunch of Flash) or RAID storage while providing tight integration with server based software.

== Products ==
ATTO products are sold directly to original equipment manufacturers (OEMs), ODMs, white box systems integrators as well as through ATTO authorized distributors and resellers. Products include: acceleration software, host bus adapters (HBAs) 16 GB, 32GB and 64 GB Fibre Channel, 12 GB SAS/SATA, and Network Interface Cards (NICs) 100 GbE, 50 GbE, 25 GbE and 10 GbE. NetApp is a customer of ATTO and has integrated the ATTO FibreBridge product line in the NetApp MetroCluster business continuity solution.

Protocol conversion products, called intelligent bridges, convert one protocol to another while adding monitoring and management features, for example: Fibre Channel to SAS/SATA, iSCSI to SAS/SATA. Switches are also offered which provide 8, 16, 24, or 48 ports in 16 GB or 8 GB Fibre Channel to enable an end-to-end SAN solution when using Fibre Channel HBAs.
