= Thunderlink =

Legacy expansion adapter for the Thunderbolt computer bus interface

ThunderLink is a legacy expansion adapter for the Thunderbolt computer bus interface, which added support for SAS, SATA, fibre optic and Ethernet interfaces.

The adapter could support throughput speeds of up to 10Gb/s.

ATTO Technology ThunderLink devices were a purpose-built Thunderbolt product designed to connect virtualized Mac hardware to 16Gb and 8Gb Fibre Channel storage solutions within VMware VSphere environments.

This provided a solution for Apple technologies application development and testing environments, virtual desktop infrastructure and cloud hosting or shared private cloud.
