= Registered state change notification =

Fibre Channel

Layer 4. Protocol mapping
- LUN masking

Layer 3. Common services

Layer 2. Network
- Fibre Channel fabric Fibre Channel zoning Registered state change notification

Layer 1. Data link
- Fibre Channel 8b/10b encoding

Layer 0. Physical

In Fibre Channel protocol, a registered state change notification (RSCN) is a Fibre Channel fabric's notification sent to all specified nodes in case of any major fabric changes. This allows nodes to immediately gain knowledge about the fabric and react accordingly.

== Overview ==
Implementation of this function is obligatory for each Fibre Channel switch, but is optional for a node. This function belongs to a second level of the protocol, or FC2.

Some events that trigger notifications are:

- Nodes joining or leaving the fabric (most common usage)
- Switches joining or leaving the fabric
- Changing the switch name

The nodes wishing to be notified in such way need to register themselves first at the Fabric Controller, which is a standardized FC virtual address present at each switch.

== RSCN and zoning ==
If a fabric has some zones configured for additional security, notifications do not cross zone boundaries if not needed. Simply, there is no need to notify a node about a change that it cannot see anyway (because it happened in a separate zone).

== Example ==
For example, let's assume there is a fabric with just one node, namely a server's FC-compatible HBA. First it registers itself for notifications. Then a human administrator connects another node, like a disk array, to the fabric. This event is known at first only to a single switch, the one that detected one of its ports going online. The switch, however, has a list of registered nodes (currently containing only the HBA node) and notifies every one of them. As the HBA receives the notification, it chooses to query the nearest switch about current list of nodes. It detects a new disk array and starts to communicate with it on a SCSI level, asking for a list of SCSI LUNs. Then it notifies a server's operating system, that there is a new SCSI target containing some LUNs. The operating system auto-configures those as new block devices, ready for use.

== See also ==
- Storage area network
- Fibre Channel
  - Fibre Channel fabric
  - Fibre Channel switch
  - Fibre Channel zoning
