= I/O Acceleration Technology =

I/O Acceleration Technology (I/OAT) is a DMA engine (an embedded DMA controller) by Intel bundled with high-end server motherboards, that offloads memory copies from the main processor by performing direct memory accesses (DMA). It is typically used for accelerating network traffic, but supports any kind of copy.

Using I/OAT for network acceleration is supported by Microsoft Windows since the release of Scalable Networking Pack for Windows Server 2003 SP1. However, it is no longer included in Windows from version 8 on-wards. It was used by the Linux kernel starting in 2006 but this feature was subsequently disabled due to an alleged lack of performance benefits while creating a possibility of data corruption.

== See also ==
- Direct memory access § DDIO
