= Switched fabric =

Network topology in which nodes are interconnected by network switches

Fibre Channel

Layer 4. Protocol mapping
- LUN masking

Layer 3. Common services

Layer 2. Network
- Fibre Channel fabric Fibre Channel zoning Registered state change notification

Layer 1. Data link
- Fibre Channel 8b/10b encoding

Layer 0. Physical

Switched fabric or switching fabric is a network topology in which network nodes interconnect via one or more network switches (particularly crossbar switches). Because a switched fabric network spreads network traffic across multiple physical links, it yields higher total throughput than broadcast networks, such as the early 10BASE5 version of Ethernet and most wireless networks such as Wi-Fi.

The generation of high-speed serial data interconnects that appeared in 2001–2004 which provided point-to-point connectivity between processor and peripheral devices are sometimes referred to as fabrics; however, they lack features such as a message-passing protocol. For example, HyperTransport, the computer processor interconnect technology, continues to maintain a processor bus focus even after adopting a higher speed physical layer. Similarly, PCI Express is just a serial version of PCI; it adheres to PCI's host/peripheral load/store direct memory access (DMA)-based architecture on top of a serial physical and link layer.

== Fibre Channel ==
Example topology of a Fibre Channel switched fabric network

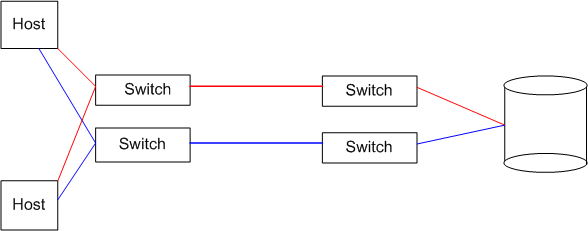
A storage area network built with two separate switched fabrics (red and blue) to increase reliability.

In the Fibre Channel Switched Fabric (FC-SW-6) topology, devices are connected through one or more Fibre Channel switches. While this topology has the best scalability of the three FC topologies (the other two are Arbitrated Loop and point-to-point), it is the only one requiring switches, which are costly hardware devices.

Visibility among devices (called nodes) in a fabric is typically controlled with Fibre Channel zoning.

Multiple switches in a fabric usually form a mesh network, with devices being on the "edges" ("leaves") of the mesh. Most Fibre Channel network designs employ two separate fabrics for redundancy. The two fabrics share the edge nodes (devices), but are otherwise unconnected. One of the advantages of such a setup is the capability of failover, meaning that in case one link breaks or a fabric goes out of order, datagrams can be sent via the second fabric.

The fabric topology allows the connection of up to the theoretical maximum of about 16 million devices, limited only by the available address space (2^{24}).

239 domains * 256 areas * 256 ports = 15,663,104

== See also ==
- Clos network
- Fabric Application Interface Standard
- InfiniBand
- Network traffic control
- RapidIO
- VPX
