= Cavium =

American fabless semiconductor company

Cavium, Inc.
- Company type: Public
- Traded as: Nasdaq: CAVM
- Industry: Processors and boards
- Founded: 2000; 26 years ago
- Founder: Raghib Hussain
- Defunct: July 6, 2018
- Fate: Acquired by Marvell Technology Group
- Headquarters: San Jose, California, United States
- Key people: Syed Ali (president & CEO); Raghib Hussain (COO)
- Products: Microprocessors, boards
- Number of employees: 850
- Website: cavium.com at the Wayback Machine (archived 2015-03-16)

Logo before the name change to Cavium Inc.

Cavium, Inc. was a fabless semiconductor company based in San Jose, California, specializing in ARM-based and MIPS-based network, video and security processors and SoCs. The company was co-founded in 2000 by Syed B. Ali and M. Raghib Hussain, who were introduced to each other by a Silicon Valley entrepreneur. Cavium offers processor- and board-level products targeting routers, switches, appliances, storage and servers.

The company went public in May 2007 with about 175 employees. As of 2011, following numerous acquisitions, it had about 850 employees worldwide, of whom about 250 were located at company headquarters in San Jose.

Cavium was acquired by Marvell Technology Group on July 6, 2018.

== History ==
=== Name change ===
On June 17, 2011, Cavium Networks, Inc. changed its name to Cavium, Inc.

=== Acquisitions by Cavium ===
Date	Acquired company	Historical product line
August 2008	Star Semiconductor	ARM-based systems-on-chip processors
December 2008	W&W Communications	Video compression software and hardware
December 2009	MontaVista Software	Carrier Grade Linux compliant Linux & embedded systems
January 2011	Celestial Semiconductor	SoCs for digital media applications, including satellite, cable, and Internet TV
February 2011	Wavesat Telecommunications	Semiconductor solutions for carrier and mobile device manufacturers
July 2014	Xpliant, Inc.	Switching and SDN Specialist
June 2016	QLogic, Inc.	Ethernet and Storage Specialist

=== Acquisition of Cavium ===
In November 2017, Cavium's board of directors agreed to the company's purchase by Marvell Technology Group for $6 billion in cash and stock. The merger was finalized on July 6, 2018.

== Products ==
Cavium began selling security processors in late 2001 with the Nitrox line. The processor had support for features like IPsec, SSL, intrusion-detection services as well as VPNs. In 2004 the company launched the Octeon processor, which was using a 64-bit MIPS instruction set. At launch Cavium offered Octeon processors with two, four eight or sixteen cores. In 2012, the company announced a 1-48 core MIPS-processor from the Octeon-line. In 2014, the company announced the ThunderX, a 48 core server SoC based on the ARMv8 architecture. Cavium also offered ethernet switches that were produced in cooperation with Xpliant since 2014.
