= QLogic =

American network device manufacturer

QLogic Corporation
- Type: Subsidiary
- Industry: Computer Networking
- Founded: 1992
- Defunct: 2016
- Fate: Acquired by Cavium
- Headquarters: Aliso Viejo, California, USA
- Key people: Jean Hu (CEO)
- Products: Fibre Channel adapters, converged network adapters, Ethernet adapters, iSCSI adapters, and ASICs
- Number of employees: 1,229 (2013)
- Website: qlogic.com at the Wayback Machine (archived 2012-10-06)

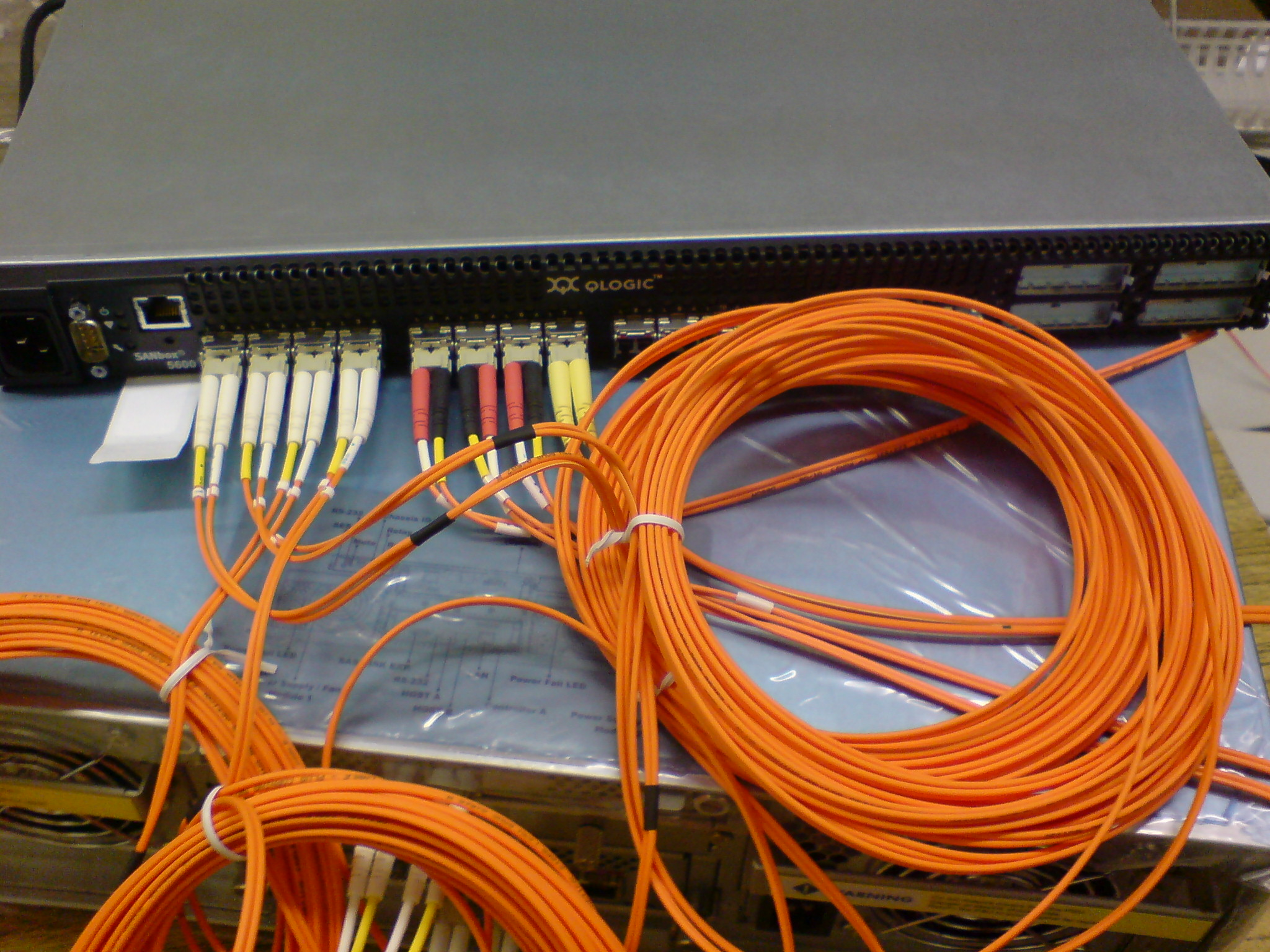
QLogic SAN-switch with optical LC connectors installed.

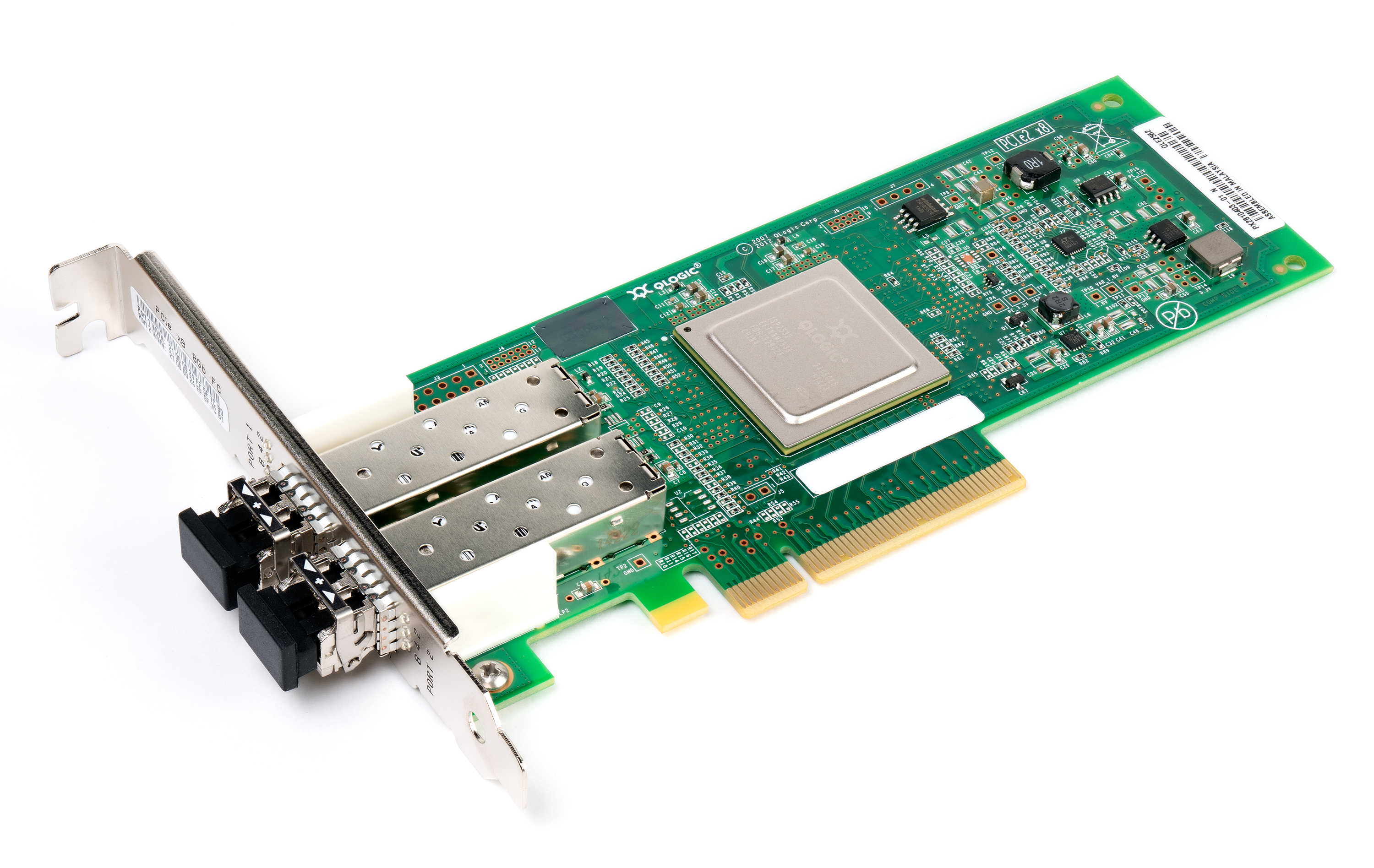
QLogic QLE2562 dual port 8Gb Fibre Channel host bus adapter card.

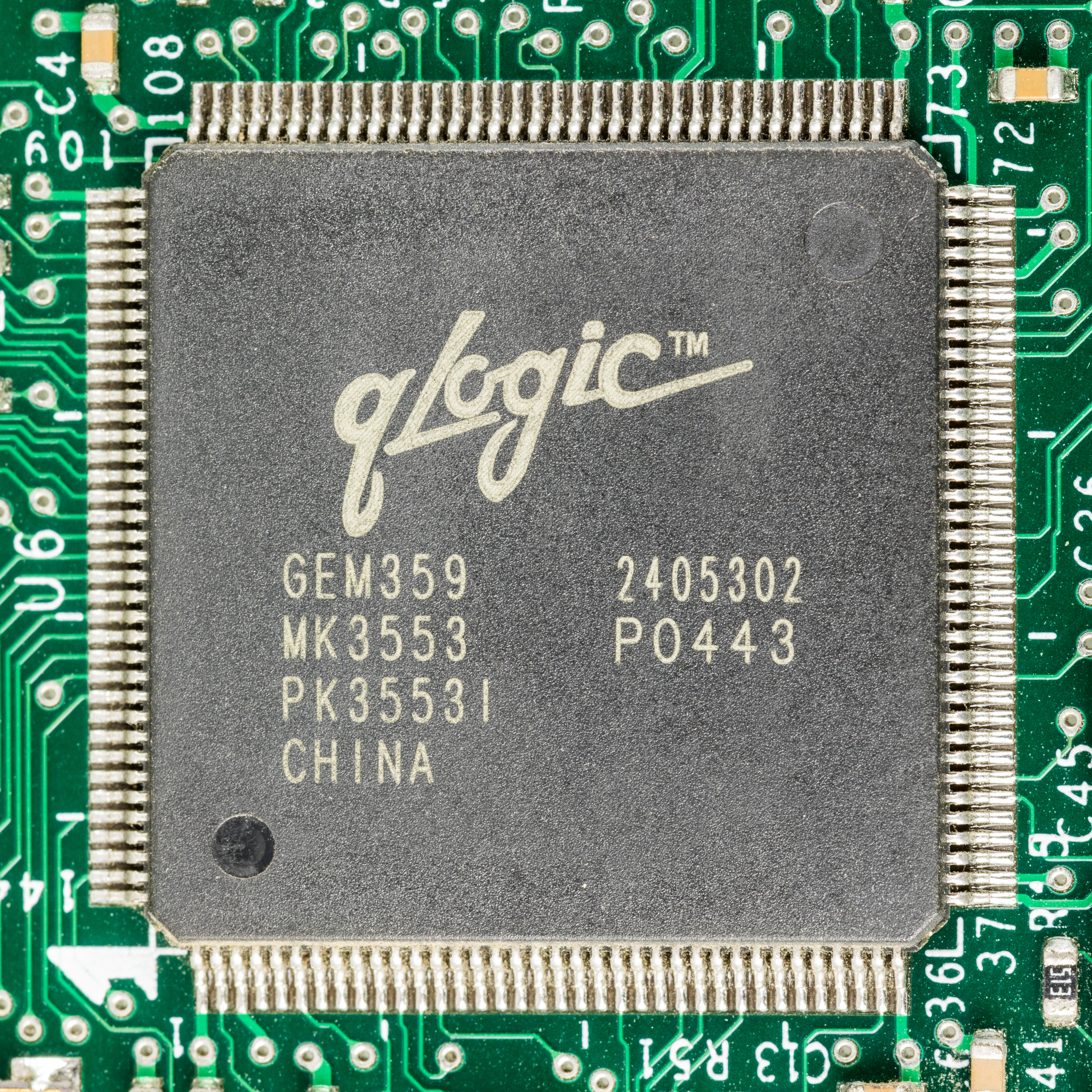
Qlogic Guardian Enclosure Management Controller GEM359

QLogic Corporation was an American manufacturer of networking server and storage networking connectivity and application acceleration products, based in Aliso Viejo, California through 2016. QLogic's products include Fibre Channel adapters, converged network adapters for Fibre Channel over Ethernet (FCoE), Ethernet network interface controllers, iSCSI adapters, and application-specific integrated circuits (ASICs). It was a public company from 1992 to 2016.

== History ==
QLogic was created in 1992 after being spun off by Emulex. QLogic's original business was disk controllers. QLogic had its initial public offering in 1994 and was traded on NASDAQ under the symbol QLGC. Originally located in a Costa Mesa, California building adjacent to Emulex, it competed against its parent company in the market for Fibre Channel controllers for storage area networks.

QLogic acquired companies including NetXen. Integrated circuit designer Silicon Design Resources Inc. based in Austin, Texas, was acquired for about $2 million in 1998. In May 2000, QLogic acquired Fibre Channel switch maker Ancor Communications for about $1.7 billion in stock. Little Mountain Group, founded in 1999 and developer of iSCSI technology, was acquired in January 2001 for about $30 million. The compiler company PathScale was acquired for about $109 million in February 2006. Silverstorm Technologies, which designed InfiniBand products, was acquired in October 2006 for about $60 million. After attempting to use PathScale for cluster computing over InfiniBand, the compiler business was sold to SiCortex in August 2006.

QLogic was led by chairman H.K. Desai from 1996, who became executive chairman in 2010 until his death in June 2014. In 2012, the InfiniBand products were sold to Intel for $125 million. Simon Biddiscombe became chief executive in November 2010, until resigning in May 2013 after two years of falling revenue. Prasad Rampalli became chief executive a few months later, until August 2015. Jean Hu became acting CEO again at that time.

QLogic announced it was being acquired by Cavium in June 2016, for about $1 billion over its balance sheet cash. After the deal closed in August 2016, job cuts were announced. It announced it would move to Irvine, California in 2017.

Cavium was acquired by Marvell Technology Group in 2018.

== Products ==
The company makes a range of networking products for storage and converged networks. Storage networking products include Fibre Channel caching adapters, Fibre Channel adapters, iSCSI adapters and Fibre Channel switches. Converged network products include Converged Network Adapters and Intelligent Ethernet Adapters.

== Acquisitions ==
In 2005, QLogic acquired Troika Networks and storage virtualization products. Later in 2009, it acquired NetXen and Intelligent Ethernet Adapter products. In 2014, QLogic signed a broad technology alliance agreement with Brocade Communications Systems and acquired its fibre channel and converged network adapter business.
