= USB mass storage device class =

USB device class for drives

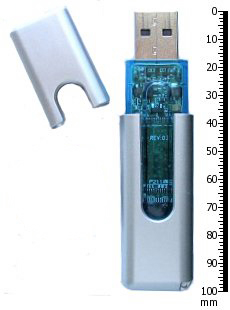
USB flash drives typically implement the USB mass storage device class.

The USB mass storage device class (also known as USB MSC or UMS) is a set of computing communications protocols, specifically a USB Device Class, defined by the USB Implementers Forum that makes a USB device accessible to a host computing device and enables file transfers between the host and the USB device. To a host, the USB device acts as an external hard drive; the protocol sets interfaces with a number of storage devices.

== Uses ==
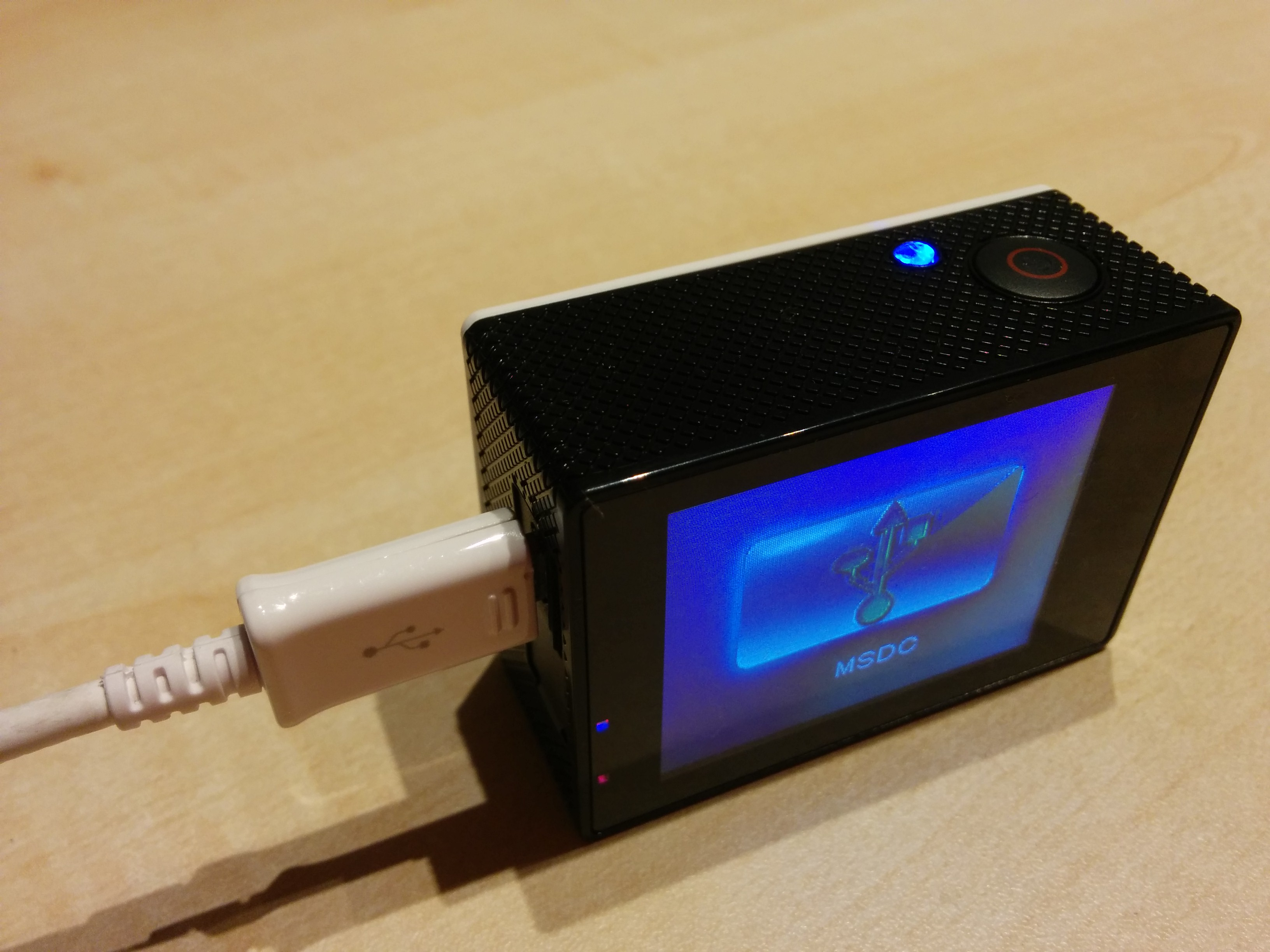
An action camera being accessed via mass storage device class

Devices connected to computers via this standard include:

- External magnetic hard drives
- External optical drives, including CD and DVD reader and writer drives
- USB flash drives
- Solid-state drives
- Adapters between standard flash memory cards and USB connections
- Digital cameras
- Portable media players
- Card readers
- PDAs
- Mobile phones

Devices supporting this standard are known as MSC (Mass Storage Class) devices. While MSC is the original abbreviation, UMS (Universal Mass Storage) has also become common use.

== Operating system support ==
Most mainstream operating systems include support for USB mass storage devices; support on older systems is usually available through patches.

=== Microsoft Windows ===
Microsoft Windows has supported MSC since Windows 2000. There is no support for USB supplied by Microsoft in Windows before Windows 95 and Windows NT 4.0. Windows 95 OSR2.1, an update to the operating system, featured limited support for USB. During that time, no generic USB mass-storage driver was produced by Microsoft (including for Windows 98), and a device-specific driver was needed for each type of USB storage device. Third-party, freeware drivers became available for Windows 98 and Windows 98SE, and third-party drivers are also available for Windows NT 4.0. Windows 2000 has support (via a generic driver) for standard USB mass-storage devices; Windows Me and all later Windows versions also include support.

Windows Mobile supports accessing most USB mass-storage devices formatted with FAT on devices with USB Host. However, portable devices typically cannot provide enough power for hard-drive disk enclosures (a 2.5-inch (64 mm) hard drive typically requires the maximum 2.5 W in the USB specification) without a self-powered USB hub. A Windows Mobile device cannot display its file system as a mass-storage device unless the device implementer adds that functionality. However, third-party applications add MSC emulation to most WM devices (commercial Softick CardExport and free WM5torage). Only memory cards (not internal-storage memory) can generally be exported, due to file-system issues; see device access, below.

The AutoRun feature of Windows worked on all removable media, allowing USB storage devices to become a portal for computer viruses. Beginning with Windows 7, Microsoft limited AutoRun to CD and DVD drives, updating previous Windows versions.

=== MS-DOS ===
Neither MS-DOS nor most compatible operating systems included support for USB. Third-party generic drivers, such as Duse, USBASPI, and DOSUSB, are available to support USB mass-storage devices. FreeDOS supports USB mass storage as an Advanced SCSI Programming Interface (ASPI) interface.

=== Classic Mac OS and macOS ===
Apple's Mac OS 9 and macOS support USB mass storage; Mac OS 8.6 supported USB mass storage through an optional driver.

=== Linux ===
The Linux kernel has supported USB mass-storage devices since version 2.3.47 (2001, backported to kernel 2.2.18). This support includes quirks and silicon/firmware bug workarounds as well as additional functionality for devices and controllers (vendor-enabled functions such as ATA command pass-through for ATA-USB bridges, used for S.M.A.R.T. or temperature monitoring, controlling the spin-up and spin-down of hard disk drives, and other options). Mobile devices running Android 6 or higher also supports USB mass storage through dual-role USB on USB-C ports, and USB-OTG on older ports.

=== Other Unix-related systems ===
Solaris has supported devices since its version 2.8 (1998), NetBSD since its version 1.5 (2000), FreeBSD since its version 4.0 (2000) and OpenBSD since its version 2.7 (2000). Digital UNIX (later known as Tru64 UNIX) has supported USB and USB mass-storage devices since its version 4.0E (1998). AIX has supported USB mass-storage devices since its 5.3 T9 and 6.1 T3 versions; however, it is not well-supported and lacks features such as partitioning and general blocking.

=== Game consoles and embedded devices ===
The Xbox 360 and PlayStation 3 support most mass-storage devices for the data transfer of media such as pictures and music. As of April 2010, the Xbox 360 (a) used a mass-storage device for saved games and the PS3 allowed transfers between devices on a mass-storage device. Independent developers have released drivers for the TI-84 Plus and TI-84 Plus Silver Edition to access USB mass-storage devices. In these calculators, the usb8x driver supports the msd8x user-interface application.

== Device access ==
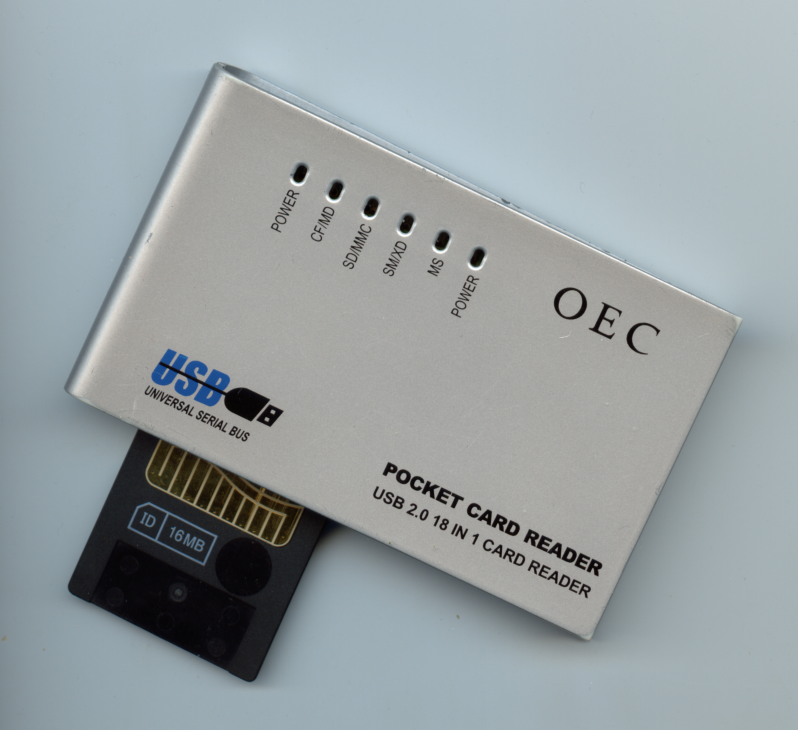
USB card readers typically implement the USB mass storage device class.

The USB mass-storage specification provides an interface to a number of industry-standard command sets, allowing a device to disclose its subclass. In practice, there is little support for specifying a command set via its subclass; most drivers only support the SCSI transparent command set, designating their subset of the SCSI command set with their SCSI Peripheral Device Type (PDT). Subclass codes specify the following command sets:

1. Reduced Block Commands (RBC)
2. SFF-8020i, MMC-2 (used by ATAPI-style CD and DVD drives)
3. QIC-157 (tape drives)
4. Uniform Floppy Interface (UFI)
5. SFF-8070i (used by ARMD-style devices)
6. SCSI transparent command set (use "inquiry" to obtain the PDT)

The specification does not require a particular file system on conforming devices. Based on the specified command set and any subset, it provides a means to read and write sectors of data (similar to the low-level interface used to access a hard drive). Operating systems may treat a USB mass-storage device like a hard drive; users may partition it in any format (such as MBR and GPT), and format it with any file system.

Because of its relative simplicity, the most common file system on embedded devices such as USB flash drives, cameras, or digital audio players is Microsoft's FAT or FAT32 file system (with optional support for long filenames). However, USB mass storage devices may be formatted with any other file system, such as NTFS on Windows NT, HFS Plus on macOS, ext2 on Linux, or Unix File System on Solaris or BSD. This choice may limit (or prevent) access to a device's contents by equipment using a different operating system. OS-dependent storage options include LVM, partition tables and software encryption.

In cameras, MP3 players and similar devices which must access a file system independent of an external host, the FAT32 file system is preferred by manufacturers. All such devices halt their file-system (dismount) before making it available to a host operating system to prevent file-system corruption or other damage (although it is theoretically possible for both devices to use read-only mode or a cluster file system). Some devices have a write-protection switch (or option) allowing them to be used in read-only mode.

Two main partitioning schemes are used by vendors of pre-formatted devices. One puts the file system (usually FAT32) directly on the device without partitioning, making it start from sector 0 without additional boot sectors, headers or partitions. The other uses a DOS partition table (and MBR code), with one partition spanning the entire device. This partition is often aligned to a high power of two of the sectors (such as 1 or 2 MB), common in solid state drives for performance and durability. Some devices with embedded storage resembling a USB mass-storage device (such as MP3 players with a USB port) will report a damaged (or missing) file system if they are reformatted with a different file system. However, most default-partition devices may be repartitioned (by reducing the first partition and file system) with additional partitions. Such devices will use the first partition for their own operations; after connecting to the host system, all partitions are available.

Devices connected by a single USB port may function as multiple USB devices, one of which is a USB mass-storage device. This simplifies distribution and access to drivers and documentation, primarily for the Microsoft Windows and Mac OS X operating systems. Such drivers are required to make full use of the device, usually because it does not fit a standard USB class or has additional functionality. An embedded USB mass-storage device makes it possible to install additional drivers without CD-ROM disks, floppies or Internet access to a vendor website; this is important, since many modern systems are supplied without optical or floppy drives. Internet access may be unavailable because the device provides network access (wireless, GSM or Ethernet cards). The embedded USB mass storage is usually made permanently read-only by the vendor, preventing accidental corruption and use for other purposes (although it may be updated with proprietary protocols when performing a firmware upgrade). Advantages of this method of distribution are lower cost, simplified installation and ensuring driver portability.

== Design ==
Some advanced hard disk drive commands, such as Tagged Command Queuing and Native Command Queuing (which may increase performance), ATA Secure Erase (which allows all data on the drive to be securely erased) and S.M.A.R.T. (accessing indicators of drive reliability) exist as extensions to low-level drive command sets such as SCSI, ATA and ATAPI. These features may not work when the drives are placed in a disk enclosure that supports a USB mass-storage interface. Some USB mass-storage interfaces are generic, providing basic read-write commands; although that works well for basic data transfers with devices containing hard drives, there is no simple way to send advanced, device-specific commands to such USB mass-storage devices (though, devices may create their own communication protocols over a standard USB control interface). The USB Attached SCSI (UAS) protocol, introduced in USB 3.0, fixes several of these issues, including command queuing, command pipes for hardware requiring them, and power management.

Specific USB 2.0 chipsets had proprietary methods of achieving SCSI pass-through, which could be used to read S.M.A.R.T. data from drives using tools such as smartctl (using the -d option followed by "chipset"). More recent USB storage chipsets support the SCSI / ATA Translation (SAT) as a generic protocol for interacting with ATA (and SATA) devices. Using esoteric ATA or SCSI pass-through commands (such as secure-erase or password protection) when a drive is connected via a USB bridge may cause drive failure, especially with the hdparm utility.

== See also ==
- List of USB Device Classes
- Disk encryption software
- Media Transfer Protocol
- Picture Transfer Protocol
- SCSI / ATA Translation
