= Advanced SCSI Programming Interface =

Computer software for connecting SCSI devices

The Advanced SCSI Programming Interface (ASPI) is a programming interface developed by Adaptec which standardizes communication on a computer bus between a SCSI driver module and SCSI (and ATAPI) peripherals.

== Structure ==
The ASPI manager software provides an interface between ASPI modules (device drivers or applications with direct SCSI support), a SCSI host adapter, and SCSI devices connected to the host adapter. The ASPI manager is specific to the host adapter and operating system; its primary role is to abstract the host adapter specifics and provide a generic software interface to SCSI devices.

On Windows 9x and Windows NT, the ASPI manager is generic and relies on the services of SCSI miniport drivers. On those systems, the ASPI interface is designed for applications which require SCSI pass-through functionality (such as CD-ROM burning software).

The primary operations supported by ASPI are discovery of host adapters and attached devices, and submitting SCSI commands to devices via SRBs (SCSI Request Blocks). ASPI supports concurrent execution of SCSI commands.

== History ==
ASPI was developed by Adaptec around 1989 and was formally introduced in January 1990. Originally supporting only MS-DOS, support for NetWare was added in 1991, while support for OS/2 and Windows 3.x was added in 1992. Originally developed only for SCSI devices, support for ATAPI devices was added later. Most other SCSI host adapter vendors (for example BusLogic, DPT, AMI, Future Domain, DTC) shipped their own ASPI managers with their hardware.

Adaptec also developed generic SCSI disk and CD-ROM drivers for DOS (ASPICD.SYS and ASPIDISK.SYS).

At least a couple of other programming interfaces for SCSI device drivers competed with ASPI in the early 1990s, including CAM (Common Access Method), developed by Apple; and Layered Device Driver Architecture, developed by Microsoft. However, ASPI was far and away more common than any of its competitors in this space, with PC Magazine declaring it a de facto standard for developing SCSI device drivers only two years after its introduction.

Starting in 1995, Microsoft licensed the interface for use with their Windows 9x operating systems. At the same time Microsoft developed SCSI Pass Through Interface (SPTI), an in-house substitute that worked on the NT platform. Microsoft did not include ASPI in Windows 2000/XP, in favor of its own SPTI.

To support USB drives under DOS, Panasonic developed a universal ASPI driver (USBASPI.SYS) that bypasses the lack of native USB support by DOS.

== Drivers ==
Examples of ASPI drivers:

| Operating system | Driver filename | Bundled |
|---|---|---|
| MS-DOS | ASPI4DOS.SYS or USBASPI.SYS (USB drives only) | No |
| Windows 3.1x | WINASPI.DLL | No |
| Windows 95, 98 and ME | WNASPI32.DLL, WINASPI.DLL, APIX.VXD and ASPIENUM.VXD | Yes |
| Windows NT, 2000, XP | WNASPI32.DLL, ASPI32.SYS | No |

== See also ==
- SCSI Pass-Through Direct (SPTD)
