= SAT 2 =

SAT 2, Sat-II, or, sat2, may refer to:

== Places ==
- SAT-2, a submarine cable linking Melkbosstrand, South Africa, to El Medano, Tenerife Island, Spain and Funchal, Madeira islands, Portugal.
- SAT2 fulfillment center, San Marcos, Texas, USA; an AMAZON.com center, see List of Amazon locations
- Satellite 2 Terminal (SAT-2), Suvarnabhumi Airport, Bangkok, Thailand

== Biology ==
- SAT2, a gene encoding for the enzyme 'diamine acetyltransferase 2'
- Sodium-coupled neutral amino acid transporter 2 (SAT2), a protein encoded by the gene 'SLC38A2'
- spermidine/spermine N1-acetyltransferase family member 2 (SAT2), a protein enzyme; see sex hormone–binding globulin
- SAT-2 serotype of foot-and-mouth disease virus

== Other uses ==
- SAT II: Subject Tests, a set of standardized tests given by The College Board for college admissions in the U.S.
- SCSI / ATA Translation 2 (SAT-2) standard

== See also ==
- SAT (disambiguation)
- Satt (disambiguation), including 'SATT'
