= Satt =

SATT or satt may refer to:

== People ==
- Émilie Satt, French singer, member of "Madame Monsieur"
- Guillermo Satt, Chilean surfer who participated in Surfing at the 2023 Pan American Games – Men's shortboard
- Sann Satt Naing (born 1997), Burmese soccer player

== Groups, organizations ==
- SATT (Société Antillaise de Transport Touristique), predecessor of the airline Point Air
- SATT (Société Algérienne des Transports Tropicaux and Société Africaine des Transports Tropicaux), Algerian transit, coach, transporter, and airline; see List of defunct airlines of Algeria
- SATT (Societa Avio Trasporti Torino), Italian airline; see List of defunct airlines of Italy

== Other uses ==
- Sátt, 2020 album by Ásgeir Trausti
- Neutral amino acid transporter A, also called "SATT", a protein encoded by the gene 'SLC1A4'
- SATT College, Kuching, Sawarak, Malaysia; in Borneo
- situation assessment trials tank (SATT), for technical divers; see submarine escape training facility

== See also ==
- John Sattler (1942–2023; nicknamed "Satts"), Australian rugger
- Standard Arabic Technical Transliteration System (SATTS)
- SAT 2 (disambiguation)
- SAT (disambiguation)
