= KCQ =

KCQ can refer to:

- Chignik Lake Airport (IATA code: KCQ), an airport in Chignik Lake, Alaska, U.S.
- Kamo language, Savannas language of Gombe State, Nigeria
- Key Code Qualifier, a kind of computing error code
- WKCQ, a radio station in Saginaw, Michigan, U.S.
