= BusLogic =

American computer hardware company

BusLogic, Inc.
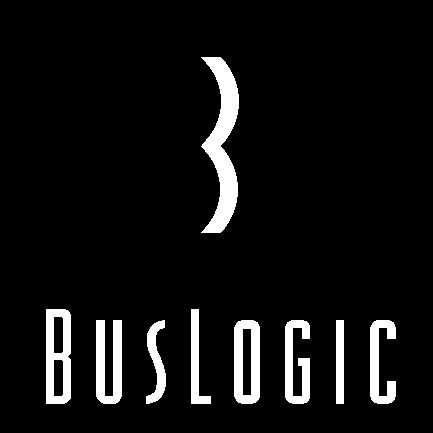
- Formerly: BusTek, Inc. (1988–1992)
- Company type: Private
- Industry: Computer
- Founded: 1988; 38 years ago in Santa Clara, California
- Founders: Jesse Chen; Peter H. Harvey
- Defunct: January 1996; 30 years ago
- Fate: Acquired by Mylex Corporation
- Products: Device controllers
- Number of employees: 140 (1995, peak)

BusLogic, Inc. (originally BusTek, Inc.), was an American computer company active from 1988 to 1996. It specialized in the production of Small Computer System Interface (SCSI) device controller chips and controller expansion cards, becoming a dominant player in that market, behind only Adaptec. In 1996, the company was acquired by Mylex Corporation.

== History ==
=== Foundation (1988–1993) ===
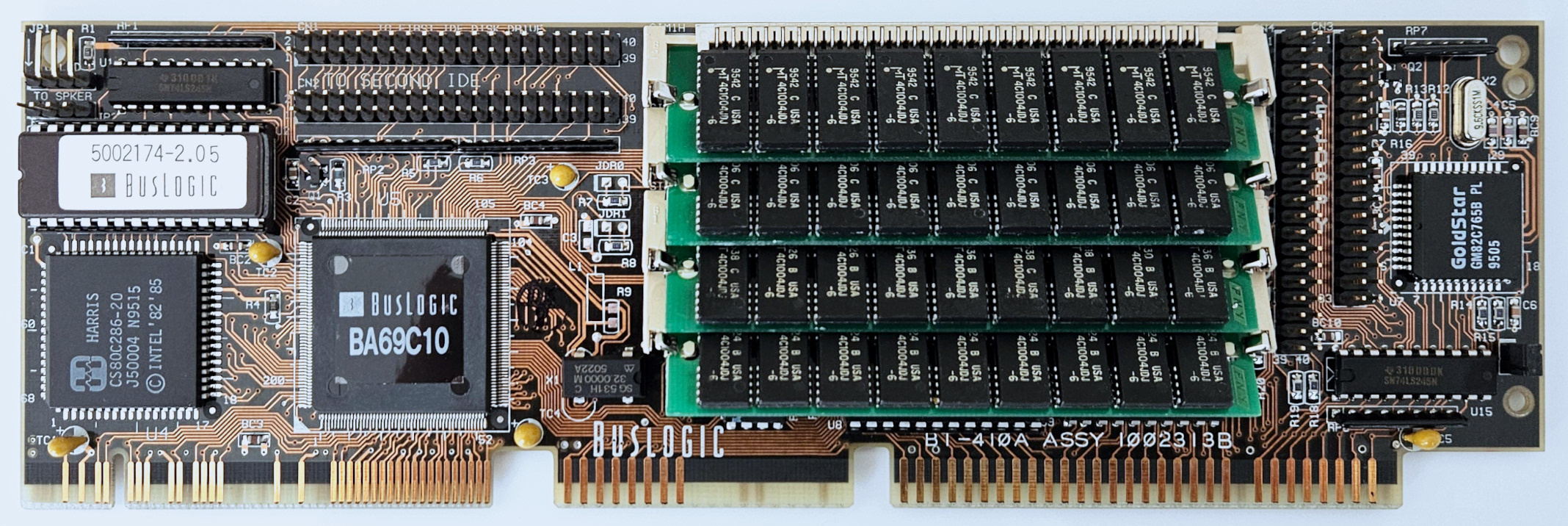
BT-410CD, VLB-based IDE cache controller from 1995

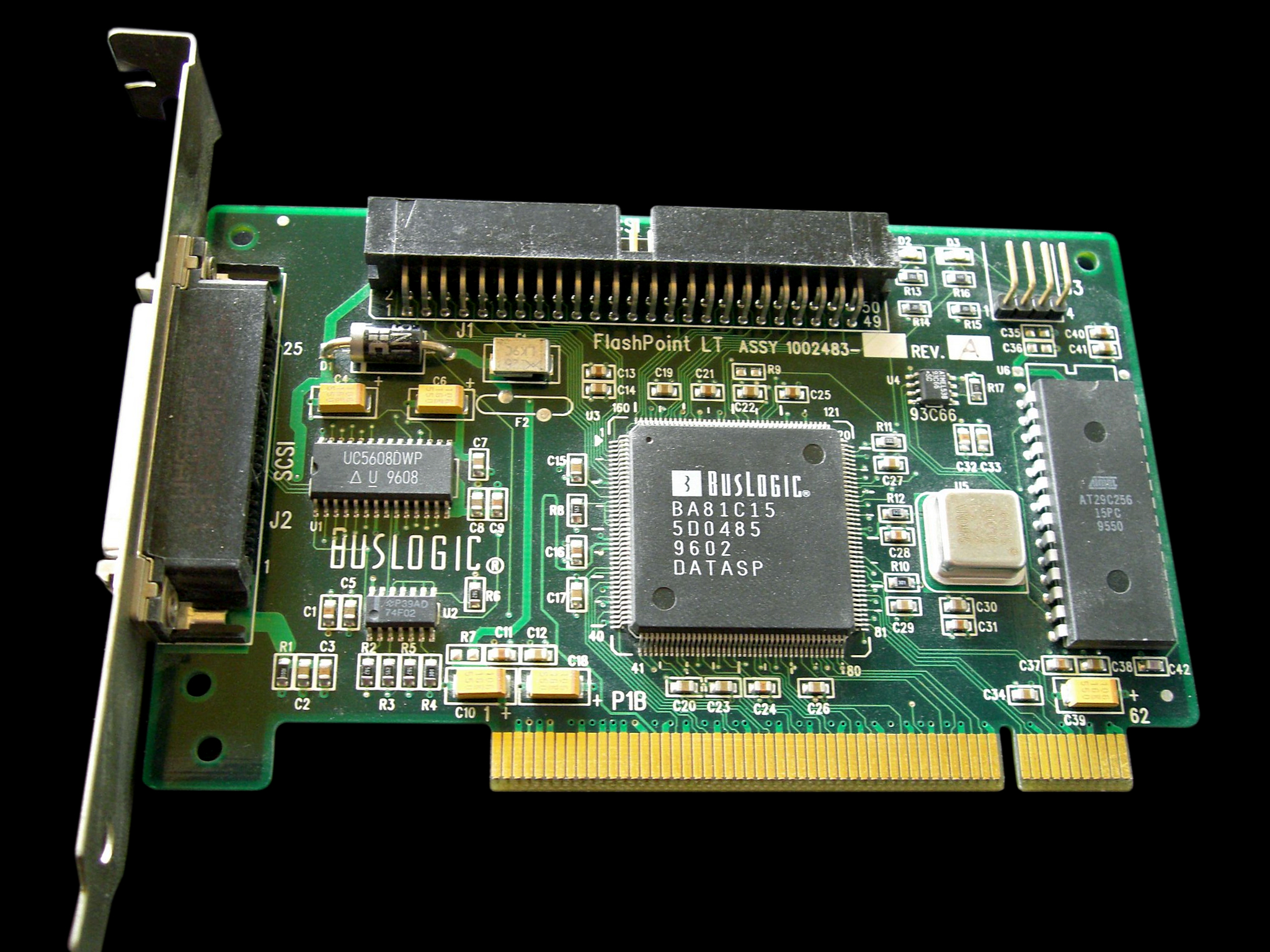
FlashPoint LT, PCI-based SCSI host adapter by BusLogic from 1996

BusLogic was founded as BusTek, Inc., in Santa Clara, California, in 1988 by Jesse Chen and Peter H. Harvey. Prior to founding BusTek, both Chen and Harvey had worked at Scientific Micro Systems (SMS), a Silicon Valley–based semiconductor fab that produced microprocessors and other integrated circuits. After leaving SMS, the duo founded BusTek with US$40,000 in start-up capital.

Under BusTek, the first product that Chen and Harvey designed was a DMA controller for desktop computers. Initially developed independently, the controller soon gained the interest of NCR Corporation, who devised a contract with BusTek to manufacture and market the chip under their Microelectronics division. NCR introduced the controller in late 1989 as the 86C05. It supported multiple desktop bus technologies, including Micro Channel, NuBus, ISA, and EISA. The 86C05 was ultimately co-designed between the two companies, with BusTek supplying the core design and BIOS, while NCR Microelectronics provided its own tweaks.

In September 1990, BusTek delivered the first bus-mastering SCSI host adapter card for EISA machines, called the BT-742A, which incorporated BusTek's own 80C10 ASIC. A SCSI host adapter card with bus mastering was widely anticipated in the burgeoning EISA market, as it was one of the last steps in making EISA systems competitive in terms of both performance and flexibility against IBM's proprietary Micro Channel architecture, which had such SCSI cards since early 1989. The BT-742A was a commercial success, BusTek earning $1 million in revenues by the end of 1990. The company followed up with the BT-747S/BT-747D and BT-542S/BT-542D in 1991, based on their second-generation 80C20 ASIC. All four cards were based on the SCSI-2 standard; the BT-747 series comprise Fast SCSI adapter cards for the PC/AT and compatibles, while the BT-542D series comprise Wide SCSI adapter cards for EISA systems. The S and D suffixes denote single-ended and differential SCSI interfaces, respectively. By the end of 1991, BusTek earned $10 million in revenue.

In July 1992, BusTek acquired San Diego, California–based Chantal Systems—a developer of RAID management software—for an undisclosed sum. Following the acquisition, BusTek changed its name to BusLogic, reflecting a broader focus on both software and hardware. The eight remaining employees of Chantal were integrated into BusLogic; the former company had filed for Chapter 7 bankruptcy dissolution two months prior. At the end of the year, BusLogic posted a doubled revenue of $20 million.

The first products developed jointly between BusLogic and Chantal debuted in February 1993. They were a trio of product bundles comprising bus-mastering Fast SCSI host adapters supporting either the ISA, Micro Channel, or EISA buses, each bundled with Chantal's Paragon RAID configuration software. BusLogic's Chantal software-based RAID products were widely used in hospitals, universities, and blue- and white-collar industries during the mid-1990s, handling loads of up to around 800 simultaneous users.

In November 1993, the company announced its first SCSI RAID controller, comprising the DA-2788, DA-2988, and DA-4988. The foremost RAID controller connected to an EISA bus, while the latter two were BusLogic's first products for the Peripheral Component Interconnect (PCI) bus.

=== Growth and acquisition (1993–1996) ===
By the end of 1993, and with Chantal under its wing, the company employed 95 workers and generated $15 million in sales for the year, becoming a market leader in the SCSI adapter segment. Their largest competitors at this point were Adaptec and Future Domain. BusLogic deviated from its SCSI roots with the release of the KT series of cache controller cards for IDE hard drives, introduced in January 1994. This family consisted of the KT-510A, KT-910A, and the KT-410A, supporting ISA, PCI, and the VESA Local Bus (VLB) respectively; the lattermost was BusLogic's first product supporting VLB.

In June 1994, BusLogic debuted their so-dubbed MultiMaster technology with a trio of bus-mastering Fast SCSI host adapters for ISA, VLB, and EISA. MultiMaster was BusLogic's name for their latest ASIC, which incorporated core logic common to all of the major desktop computer buses. This integration significantly reduced the number of device drivers they had to distribute, as now the end user's operating system was the only consideration (rather than the bus architecture in tandem with the operating system).

By late 1994, the company was the second-largest producer of SCSI silicon, behind Adaptec. Their catalog comprised 25 products, while its headquarters office spanned 36,000 square feet, housing 130 workers, including 50 full-time engineers. In addition, it had multiple branch offices throughout the United States and abroad, including in Boston, Minneapolis, Washington, D.C., Taipei, Hong Kong, Paris, Tokyo.

BusLogic found the going rough in the mid-1990s, after Adaptec had acquired several of BusLogic's smaller competitors including Future Domain and Trantor Systems. Despite this, BusLogic generated annual sales of $24 million in 1995; employment peaked at 140 workers that year. The company planned further expansion into Europe in 1994, with offices in Germany and the United Kingdom earmarked for opening in the following year. BusLogic additionally planned to sell products based on Fibre Channel (a high-speed, lossless data transfer protocol widely used in storage area networks), joining the Fibre Channel Industry Association and designing peripherals based on the standard for release in 1996.

Before it could release any Fiber Channel products, however, the company was acquired by Mylex Corporation, a maker of RAID controllers and LAN management software. The acquisition was announced in December 1995, BusLogic receiving stocks of Mylex valuated at roughly $55 million. The acquisition was finalized in late January 1996, BusLogic's shareholders netting additional stock options post-acquisition, increasing the terms of the sale to over $67.9 million. Mylex retained BusLogic's Santa Clara plant as a manufacturing facility for its RAID products.

=== Post-acquisition (since 1996) ===
Following the sale of BusLogic to Mylex, co-founder Harvey founded Creative Design Solutions, a maker of network-attached storage servers and other local area network products.

The acquisition of BusLogic was initially a success for Mylex, the company's revenue growing from about $100 million in mid-1995 to $173 million in mid-1996. However, Mylex's stock dropped sharply in July 1996, after several of its largest customers either announced their own in-house RAID controllers or began making contracts with Adaptec, its largest rival. Following a long sales slump, in July 1997, Mylex announced layoffs within the company and disclosed the imminent shuttering of the old BusLogic plant.

BusLogic's device drivers are still used by Oracle Corporation's VirtualBox as the sole means to emulate SCSI devices in a virtual machine, as of 2023.
