= Future Domain =

American computer hardware company

Future Domain Corporation
- Formerly: Pacific Management & Engineering Company
- Type: Private
- Industry: Computer
- Founded: 1982 in Tustin, California, United States
- Founder: Jack A. Allweiss
- Defunct: July 1995; 31 years ago
- Fate: Acquired by Adaptec
- Headquarters: Irvine, California, United States
- Number of employees: 97 (1995, peak)

Future Domain Corporation was a privately held American computer hardware company active from 1982 to 1995 and based in Orange County, California. The company was among the first to produce Small Computer System Interface (SCSI) device controller expansion cards, later controller ICs. It was acquired by Adaptec in 1995 for US$25 million.

== History ==
=== Foundation (1982–1990) ===
Future Domain was founded in 1982 as the Pacific Management & Engineering Company (PM&E) in Tustin, California by Jack A. Allweiss. Before founding Future Domain, Allweiss previously worked for the Burroughs Corporation, designing some of the company's Large Systems mainframes. PM&E spent the first four years of its existence as a one-man design consultancy firm to large computer hardware companies, before pivoting to producing their own hardware in the mid-1980s.

The company's first product, marketed under its new name Future Domain, was the TMC-820, an inexpensive, 8-bit SCSI host adapter for the IBM Personal Computer. Introduced in early 1986, the TMC-820 was marketed on the merit of its ease of use, omitting any jumpers on board, configuration instead being done in firmware as well as drivers on floppy disk. Future Domain was one of the first SCSI host adapter manufacturers on the market, at a time when Adaptec and NCR had dominated the field as early pioneers. The built-in firmware supported Seagate and Rodime's SCSI hard disk drives introduced in the same year, as well as graphical laser printers (being one of the first plug-and-play SCSI host adapters with native support for printers). It also supported the first CD-ROM drives on the market at the time. The fastest data transfer rate the TMC-820 supported, in terms of bandwidth, was 32 MHz. Future Domain followed this up with the TMC-870 in late 1986, which added support for 360-KB and 1.2-MB 5.25-inch floppy disk drives, allowing users to consolidate their expansion cards by negating the need for a separate floppy controller.

Succeeding host adapters by Future Domain spanned both 8-bit and 16-bit ISA cards, as well as 16-bit MCA cards under the MSC line. Unlike the ISA-based cards, MSC-prefixed host adapters from Future Domain were bus-mastered.

By 1988, Future Domain was offering its own custom-designed LSI chips for the PC that were host adapters in and of themselves. The company supplied their chips to third-party peripheral makers, motherboard manufacturers and systems builders. Setting Future Domain apart from their competition was their emphasis on working with developers of device drivers and operating systems to ensure both software and hardware compatibility with their chips. According to Allweiss, their competitors tended towards a hands-off approach, leaving vendors to write their own drivers and software compatible with their chips, despite the relative complexity of SCSI imposing a steep learning curve (especially in the late 1980s when the technology was still fresh). In 1990, the company introduced the first single-chip SCSI-2 host adapter chip, compatible with both MCA and ISA buses.

=== Growth and acquisition (1990–1995) ===
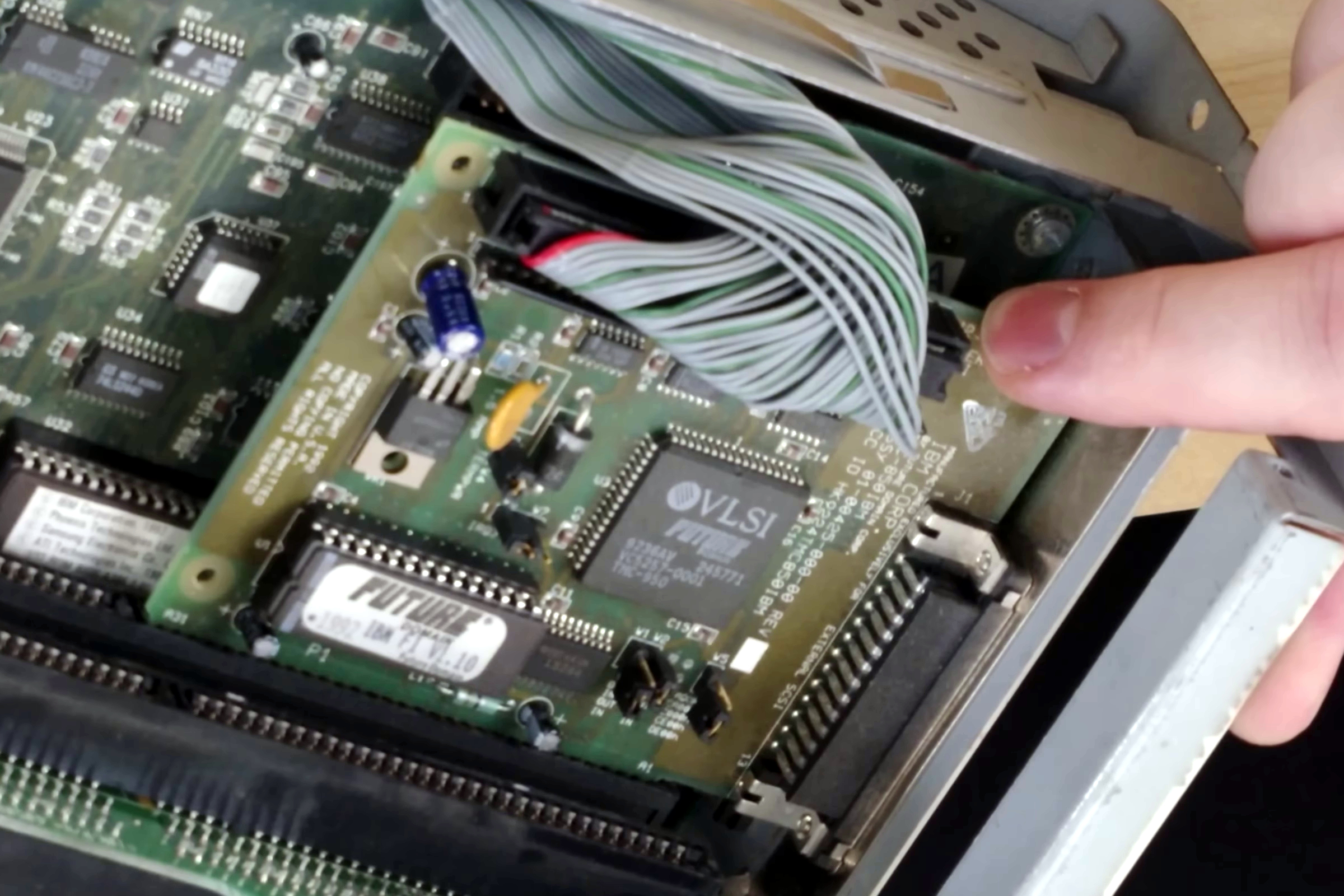
TMC-850IBM, 8-bit ISA SCSI controller by Future Domain installed in an IBM EduQuest computer

Future Domain moved from Tustin to Irvine, California, sometime around 1990. That year, Future Domain was ranked the 187th fastest-grown private company according to an Inc. survey. Around 40 percent of the company's clientele were overseas; this had the side-effect of cushioning the company amid the early 1990s recession. The company had a projected revenue of $15 million in 1992 and shipped 1.5 million SCSI host adapters by 1993. In early 1992, the company acquired Western Digital's SCSI host adapter patents, technologies, and trademarks for an undisclosed sum. As well, they inherited Western Digital's customer base and remaining inventory of SCSI products.

In 1993, Future Domain entered a relationship with IBM to be their exclusive supplier of SCSI host adpater cards across their multimedia systems; they saw extensive use in IBM's PS/2, PS/1, and PS/ValuePoint lines. By the mid-1990s, Future Domain's SCSI host adapter chips were nearly ubiquitous among vendors of multimedia PCs and CD-ROM kits. Many vendors opted to package their wares with Future Domain's TMC-840 card, among their most inexpensive offerings but also antiquated and slow by the standards of the mid-1990s, owing to its 8-bit data path. In 1993, Future Domain began supplying their each of their cards with the PowerSCSI! driver utility (also available for free on their BBS). It was lauded for its ease of use, with Jan Smith of Computer Shopper writing that it "makes SCSI what the standard has always promised to be—a plug-and-play connection for a variety of PC peripherals".

In 1994, Future Domain led a consortium of companies including Western Digital, Seagate, and Sony, to develop ATA Software Programming Interface (ATASPI; not to be confused with ATAPI), a proposed API specification for Windows that aimed to extend Windows' file system support for EIDE drives to include parallel tape drives. The proposal fizzled after several years.

In July 1995, by which point the company had 77 permanent workers and 20 freelancers, Future Domain was acquired by its chief rival Adaptec for $25 million.

== See also ==
- BusLogic, another rival in the SCSI host adapter industry
