= UASP =

UASP may refer to:

- USB Attached SCSI Protocol, in computing
- Pavlodar Airport (ICAO code), Kazakhstan
- Three Unit Assessments or UASPs, part of the Scottish Higher school exams
- Anarchist Union of São Paulo, an organisation; see Anarchism in Brazil
- USA Perpignan, a French rugby union club officially named Union Sportive Arlequins Perpignanais
