= SCSI architectural model =

The SCSI architectural model provides an abstract view of the way that SCSI devices communicate. It is intended to show how the different SCSI standards are inter-related.

The main concepts and terminology of the SCSI architectural model are:

- Only the externally observable behavior is defined in SCSI standards.
- The relationship between SCSI devices is described by a client-server service-delivery model. The client is called a SCSI initiator and the server is called a SCSI target.
- A SCSI domain consists of at least one SCSI device, at least one SCSI target and at least one SCSI initiator interconnected by a service delivery subsystem.

== Devices ==
A SCSI device has one or more SCSI ports, and a SCSI port may have an optional SCSI port identifier (SCSI ID or PID). A SCSI device can have an optional SCSI device name which must be unique within the SCSI domain in which the SCSI device has SCSI ports. This is often called a World Wide Name. Note that the "world" may only consist of a very small number of SCSI devices.

== Targets ==
A SCSI target consists of one or more logical units (LUNs), which are identified by logical unit numbers. A LUN may have dependent LUNs embedded within it. This can recur up to a maximum nesting depth of four addressable levels.

== Communication layers ==
There are three type of SCSI ports: initiator ports, target ports and target/initiator ports. A SCSI device may contain any combination of initiator ports, target ports and target/initiator ports.

SCSI distributed objects are considered to communicate in a three layer model:

- The highest level of abstraction is the SCSI Application Layer (SAL) where an initiator and a target are considered to communicate using SCSI commands sent via the SCSI application protocol.
- The SCSI Transport Protocol Layer (STPL) is where an initiator and a target are considered to communicate using a SCSI transport protocol. Examples of SCSI transport protocols are Fibre Channel, SSA, SAS, UAS, iSCSI and the SCSI Parallel Interface.
- The lowest level is the SCSI Interconnect Layer (SIL) where an initiator and a target are considered to communicate using an interconnect. It consists of the services, signaling mechanism and interconnect subsystem used for the physical transfer of data from an initiator to a target.

== Tasks ==
A SCSI task is represented by an I_T_L_Q nexus. This is where one Initiator Port talks to one Target Port, addressing one LUN and together they execute one task (identified by Q).
