= Distributed Processing Technology =

Former American computer hardware company

Distributed Processing Technology Corporation
- Company type: Private
- Industry: Computer
- Founded: 1977; 48 years ago in Maitland, Florida, United States
- Founder: Steve Goldman
- Defunct: December 1999; 25 years ago
- Fate: Acquired by Adaptec
- Products: Intelligent storage controllers
- Website: dpt.com at the Wayback Machine (archived July 15, 1997)

Distributed Processing Technology Corporation (DPT) was an American computer hardware company active from 1977 to 1999. Founded in Maitland, Florida, DPT was an early pioneer in computer storage technology, popularizing the use of disk caching in the 1980s and 1990s.

== History ==
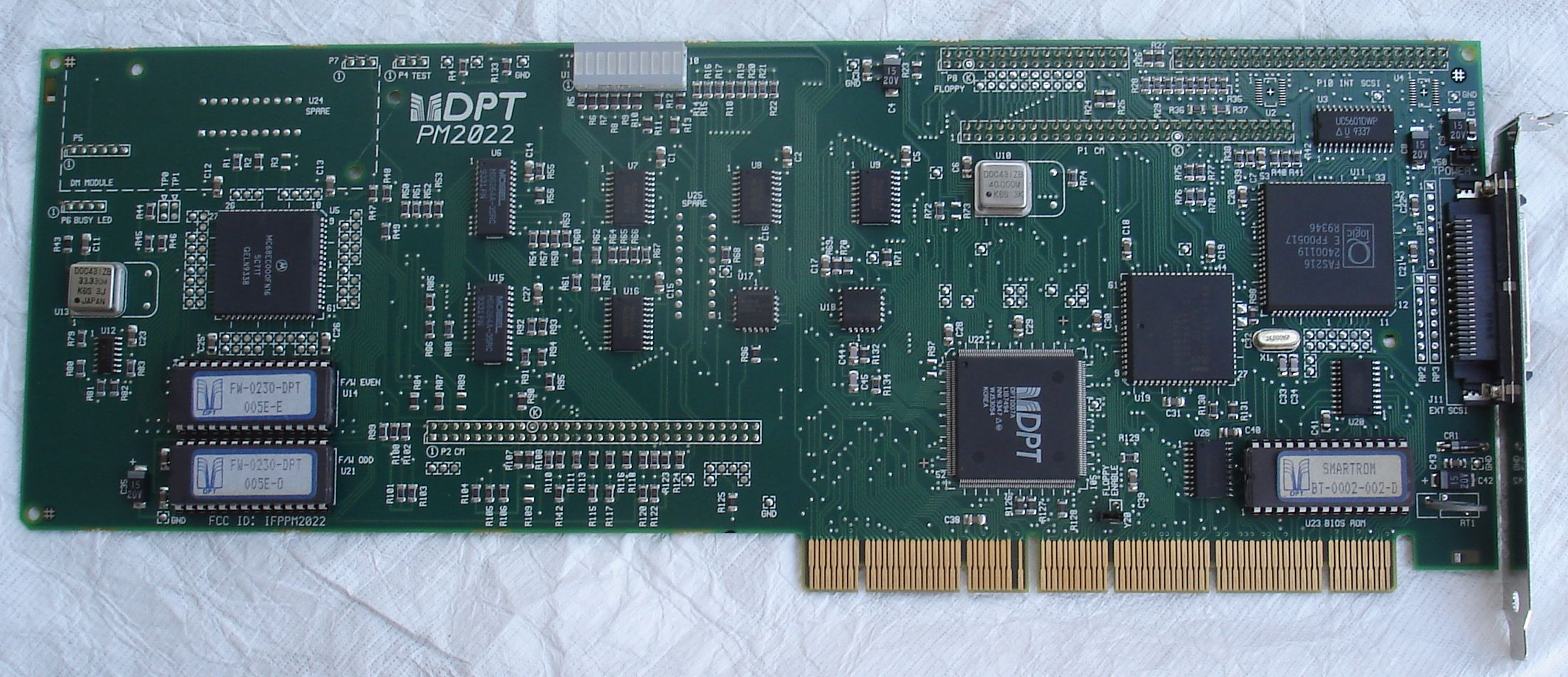
DPT EISA Fast SCSI Controller PM2022

DPT was founded in Maitland, Florida, by Steve Goldman in 1977. The company was the first to design, manufacture and sell microprocessor-based intelligent caching disk controllers to the OEM computer market. Prior to DPT, disk caching technology had been implemented in proprietary hardware in mainframe computing to improve the speed of disk access.

DPT's first product: PM3001 caching floppy disk controller

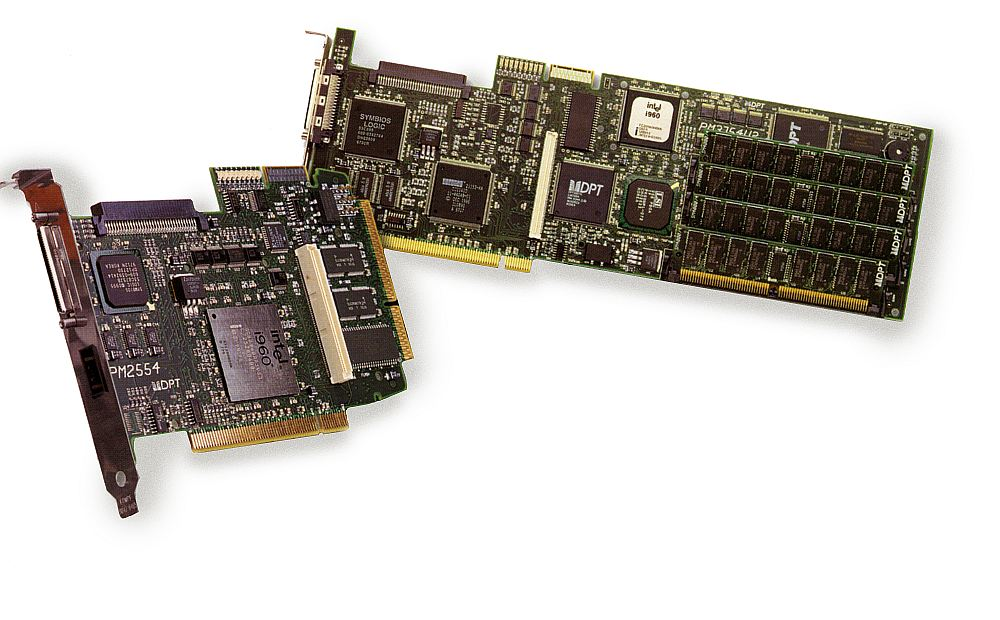
DPT PM2554 and PM3754112 SCSI RAID disk controllers

DPT's products popularized the use of disk caching in the 1980s. The company was also a pioneering designer of RAID controller ASICs. According to Bill Brothers, Unix product manager at the Santa Cruz Operation (SCO), a computer operating system vendor, "The kind of performance those guys (DPT) produce is phenomenal. It's unlike any other product on the market."

Goldman served as the president and chief executive officer from DPT's inception until the company was acquired by Adaptec in November 1999 for US$236 million. Adaptec completed their acquisition of DPT in December 1999.
