= SemiAccurate =

Technology news website

- Website type: Blog
- Available in: English
- Owners: Stone Arch Networking Services, Inc.
- Creator: Charlie Demerjian
- Revenue: Unknown
- Website: SemiAccurate.com
- Commercial: Yes
- Registration: Yes
- Launched: 2009
- Current status: Active

SemiAccurate (S|A in short) is a U.S.-based technology-news and -opinion web site, founded in 2009 by Charlie Demerjian after his departure from The Inquirer. The site lists as its contributors: Charlie Demerjian (the site's founder), Thomas Ryan and Leo Yim.

As of 2017 the site operates under a partial paywall model, making the majority of its content publicly available at no cost to readers - but subscribers to the "Student-" and "Professional-"level tiers receive access to special analysis articles and reports on industry trends similar to white papers.

== Notable stories ==
In February 2010, SemiAccurate ran a story on the yet to be released, "Fermi", microprocessor from Nvidia, which called the chip, "Hot, Slow, Late and Unmanufacturable."

In August 2010, SemiAccurate broke a story related to Sony's admitting to defective graphics chips in some of its laptops.

In May 2011, SemiAccurate published a story on Apple dropping Intel from its laptop line within a few years. This story was covered by a large number of U.S.-based as well as international news organizations. ZDNet and Barron's both weighed in on the validity of the story.

In June 2011, SemiAccurate published a story detailing the scandal that led AMD, Nvidia, and VIA to leave Intel as the lone semiconductor design company in the BAPCo consortium. In response, Nigel Dessau, Chief Marketing Officer of AMD, published a blog titled "Voting for Openness" shortly after this story went up, and explained AMD's side of the story.

In August 2011, SemiAccurate published two stories, one covering the specifications of Nvidia's unreleased mobile graphics line up, and another covering the specifications of AMD's (one of Nvidia's direct competitors) unreleased mobile graphics line up. Softpedia, VR-Zone, TweakTown, and the Tom's Hardware Forum all credited SemiAccurate for leaking these specifications.

== Reader supported ==
On December 4, 2012, SemiAccurate moved from an ad revenue supported business model to a paywall business model. This paywall model had three tiers, Curious (free), Member ($200 per year), and Professional ($1000 per year).

On May 5, 2013, SemiAccurate amended this model to reduce the number of subscription tiers from three, down to two. Under the revised pay wall model the Curious and Member levels were replaced by the Student level membership ($100 per year), while the Professional level membership remained at the same.
