= Command descriptor block =

Storage device command data structure

In SCSI, the command descriptor block (CDB) is a structure used for sending commands between computers and peripheral devices. This is often particularly used as a standard for transferring data between computers and storage devices.

== Description ==
In the initial SCSI-1 specification, the CDB can be a total of 6, 10, 12, or 16 bytes. Later versions of the SCSI standard such as iSCSI allow for variable-length CDBs. The CDB consists of a one-byte operation code followed by some command-specific parameters. The parameters need not be a full byte long, and the parameter length varies from one command to another. The available commands, with links to articles describing the detailed structure of many of them, are listed in the article List of SCSI commands.

Typical CDB structures, for the 6- and 16-byte SCSI Request Sense Command, opcode 3, are:

6-byte CDB
Bit Byte	7	6	5	4	3	2	1	0
0	Operation code = 03h							
1	LUN			Reserved				
2	Reserved							
3	Reserved							
4	Allocation length							
5	Control							

16-byte CDB
Bit Byte	7	6	5	4	3	2	1	0
0	Operation code = 03h							
1	LUN			Service Action				
2	Logical Block (MSB)							
3								
4								
5	Logical Block (LSB)							
6	Addition CBP information							
7	Addition CBP information							
8	Addition CBP information							
9	Addition CBP information							
10	Allocation length (MSB)							
11								
12								
13	Allocation length (LSB)							
14	Misc. CDB data							
15	Control							

An example with different allocation of bits to parameters is the 6-byte SCSI Mode Sense Command:

Bit Byte	7	6	5	4	3	2	1	0
0	Operation code = 1Ah							
1	LUN			Reserved	DBD	Reserved		
2	PC		Page code					
3	Reserved							
4	Allocation length							
5	Control							

The generic form of the 12-byte CDB is:

Bit Byte	7	6	5	4	3	2	1	0
0	Operation code							
1	miscellaneous CDB information			SERVICE ACTION (if required)				
2	Logical Block (MSB)							
3								
4								
5								
6	TRANSFER LENGTH (if required)							
7	PARAMETER LIST LENGTH (if required)							
8	ALLOCATION LENGTH (if required)							
9								
10	miscellaneous CDB information							
11	CONTROL							
