= SAT (disambiguation) =

The SAT is a standardized college admissions test in the United States.

SAT, Sat, or sats may also refer to:

== Communities ==
- Sennacieca Asocio Tutmonda or World Non-national Association, an international association of leftist Esperanto-speakers
- Andalusian Workers' Union or Sindicato Andaluz de Trabajadores, a Spanish trade union
- Subtle Asian Traits, a Facebook group

== Education ==
- National Curriculum assessment, sometimes referred to as standard attainment tests, is a series of educational assessments in the United Kingdom, colloquially known as Sats or SATs
- South African Theological Seminary

== Government and military ==
- Servicio de Administración Tributaria, Mexico's Tax Administration Service
- Special Assault Team, a counter-terrorist unit of the National Police Agency of Japan
- State Administration of Taxation, China's internal revenue service
- State Administrative Tribunal, an independent body that makes and reviews a range of administrative decisions in Western Australia
- Su Altı Taarruz, Turkish special naval attack commandos

== Language ==
- Sat (letter), a letter in the Ge'ez alphabet
- Sat (Sanskrit), a word in Sanskrit meaning "the true essence (nature)"
- Sitting, of which sat is the past tense
- Santali language's ISO 639-3 language code

== People ==
- Sat (rapper) (born 1975), French rapper
- Sat, a pen name used by cartoonist Bob Satterfield

== Science, mathematics, and technology ==
- Site acceptance test, in engineering
- Surface air temperature, in meteorology
- Oxygen saturation (medicine), commonly referred to as "sats"

=== Computing ===
- .SAT, a file extension for ACIS CAD files
- Boolean satisfiability problem (SAT, 2-SAT, 3-SAT)
- SCSI / ATA Translation, a computer device communications standard
- Satoshi, the smallest subunit of Bitcoin (BTC 1/100000000 = 0.00000001), commonly referred to as "sats"
- EchoStar Corporation, an American telecommunications company, which has the stock symbol SATS

== Sports ==
- The S.A.T., a professional wrestling tag-team
- Sports Academy Tirur

== Transport ==
- South Acton railway station (England), London, England, National Rail station code
- Suomen Autoteollisuus, a Finnish truck manufacturer now known as Sisu Auto

=== Aviation ===
- Southern Air Transport
- SAT Airlines, a Russian airline based in Sakhalin
- SATS (company), a catering service provider at Singapore Changi Airport
  - SATS Security Services
- Special Air Transport or Germania, a German airline
- Static air temperature, the temperature of the air around an aircraft
- SAT, San Antonio International Airport's IATA code and FAA LID
- Small Aircraft Transportation System
- Stansted Airport Transit System

== Other uses ==
- Sat, Jilu, a historical Assyrian hamlet in the Jilu district in the Hakkari region of what is now Turkey
- Sat, an abbreviation for Saturday

== See also ==
- Sat.1, a German television channel
- SAT 10, the Stanford Achievement Test Series, tests assessing knowledge of school pupils in the United States
- SAT Subject Tests or SAT II, standardized tests given by The College Board on individual subjects for United States college admissions
- Superman: The Animated Series (STAS)
- Saturation (disambiguation)
