= Adaptec =

American computer storage company

Adaptec, Inc.

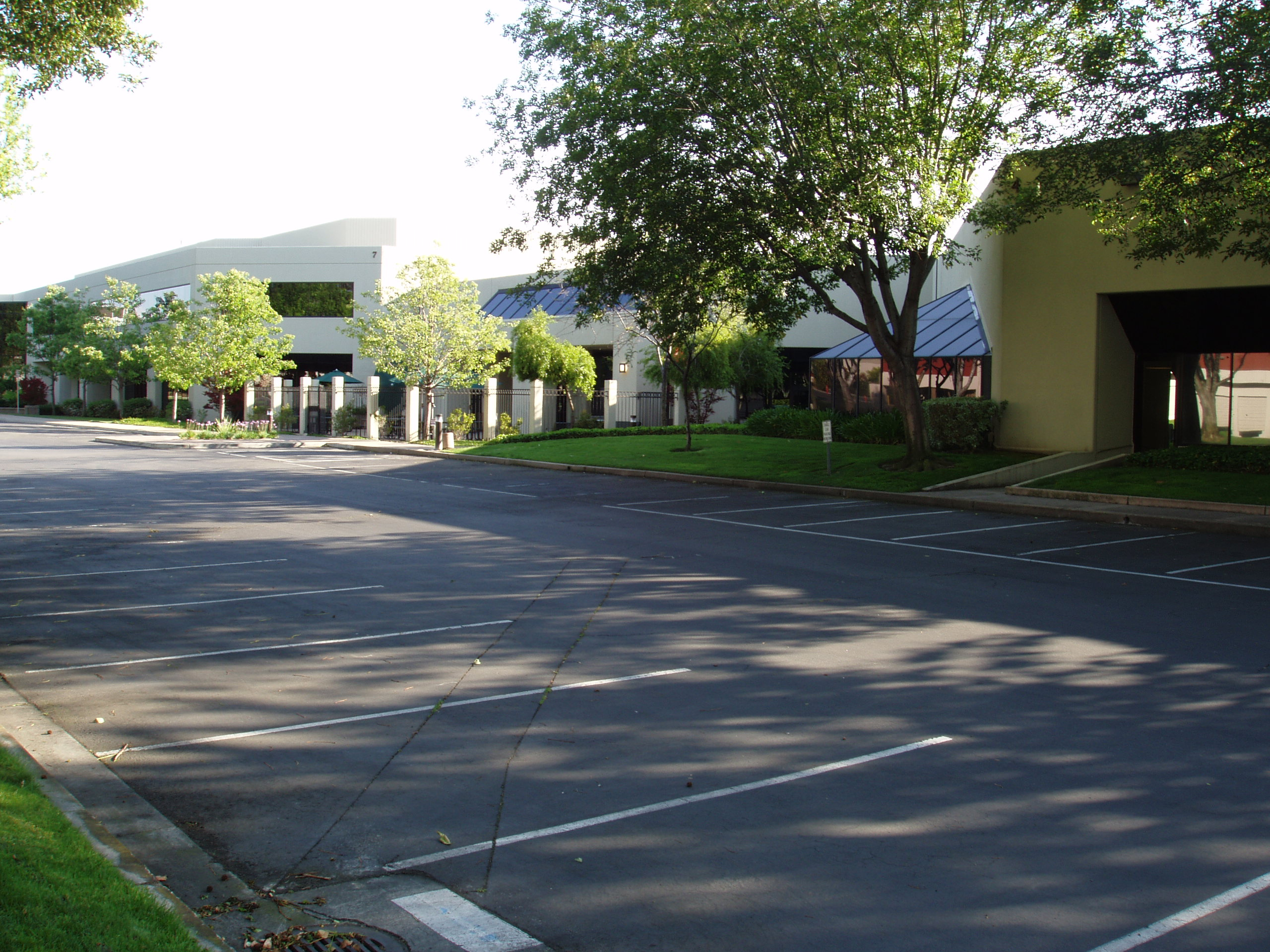
- Adaptec HQ
- Type: Public
- Traded as: Nasdaq: ADPT
- Industry: Computer storage
- Founded: 1981; 45 years ago
- Founder: Larry Boucher
- Defunct: June 8, 2010
- Fate: Acquired by PMC-Sierra
- Headquarters: Milpitas, California, United States
- Products: RAID, host adapter

Adaptec, Inc., was an American computer storage company and remains a brand for computer storage products. The company was an independent firm from 1981 to 2010, at which point it was acquired by PMC-Sierra, which itself was later acquired by Microsemi, which itself was later acquired by Microchip Technology.

== History ==
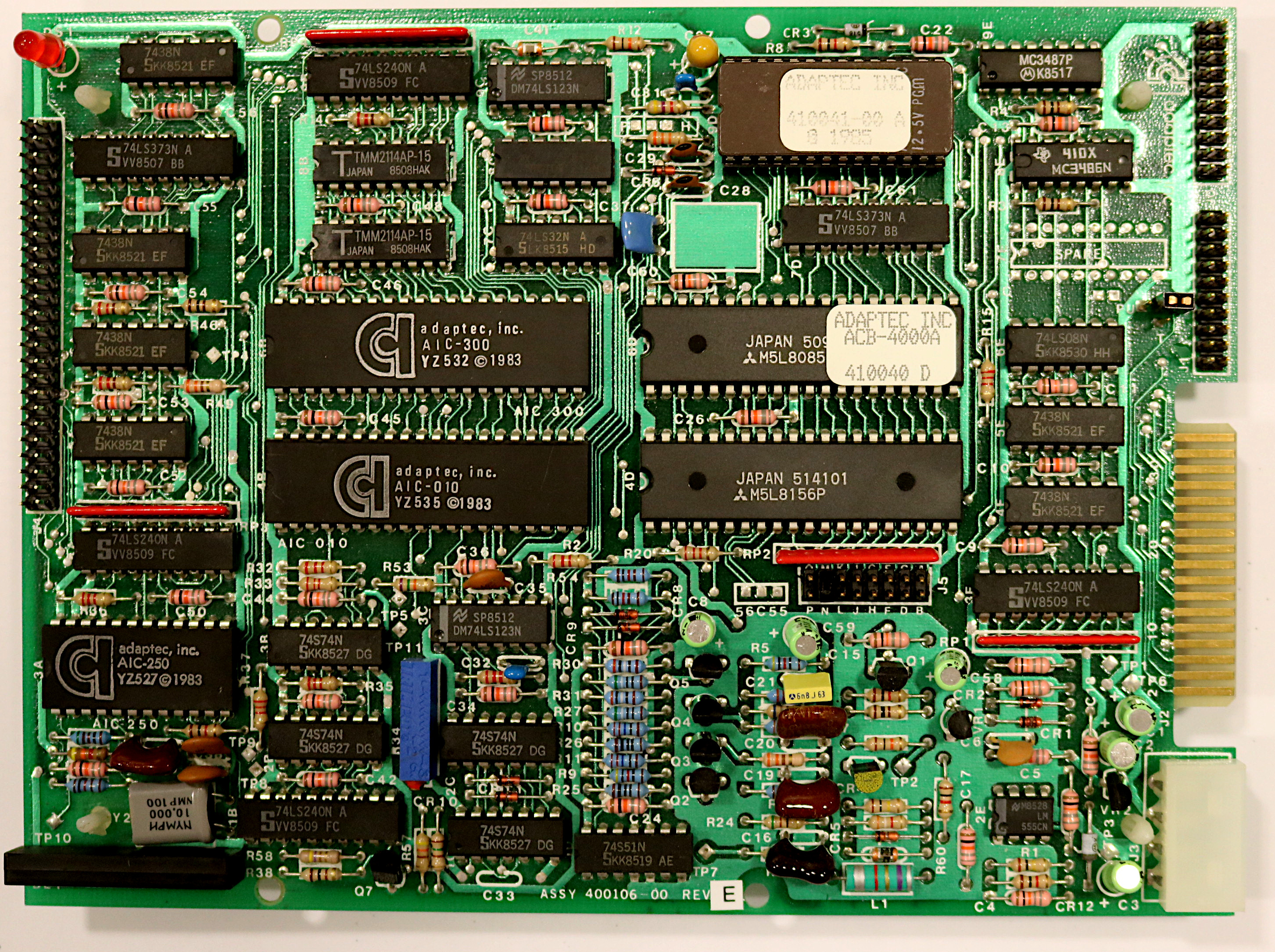
Adaptec ACB-4000A SASI card from 1985.

Larry Boucher, Wayne Higashi, and Bernard Nieman founded Adaptec in 1981. At first, Adaptec focused on devices with Parallel SCSI interfaces. Popular host bus adapters included the 154x/15xx ISA family, the 2940 PCI family, and the 29160/-320 family. Their cross-platform ASPI was an early API for accessing and integrating non-disk devices like tape drives, scanners and optical disks. With advancements in technology, RAID functions were added while interfaces evolved to PCIe and SAS.

Adaptec made a number of acquisitions in the 1990s to expand its reach in the SCSI peripheral market. In March 1993, it acquired Trantor Systems Ltd. of Fremont, California, for $10 million. In July 1995, it acquired Future Domain Corporation of Irvine, California, for $25 million. In 1999, it acquired Distributed Processing Technology for $236 million.

On May 10, 2010, PMC-Sierra, Inc. and Adaptec, Inc. announced they had entered into a definitive agreement of PMC-Sierra acquiring Adaptec's channel storage business on May 8, 2010, which included Adaptec's RAID storage product line, the Adaptec brand, a global value added reseller customer base, board logistics capabilities, and SSD cache performance solutions. The transaction was expected to close in approximately 30 days, subject to customary closing conditions. Following the sale, Adaptec would retain its Aristos ASIC technology business, certain real estate assets, more than 200 patents, and approximately $400 million in cash and marketable securities.

On June 8, 2010, PMC-Sierra and Adaptec announced the completion of the acquisition. PMC-Sierra renamed the channel storage business "Adaptec by PMC". PMC-Sierra was in turn acquired by Microsemi in January 2016.

The old Adaptec, Inc. changed its name to ADPT Corporation, and then again to Steel Excel, Inc. Steel Excel was an investment firm that then merged with Handy & Harman Ltd. to form Steel Partners, a conglomerate.

== Products ==
Adaptec produced interface products involving SCSI, USB, IEEE 1394 (Firewire), iSCSI, Fibre Channel, and video. Adaptec once produced CD- and DVD-burning software under the brand names of Easy CD Creator and Toast, as well as network-attached storage devices such as the Snap Server product line.

The Adaptec brand is used to sell host bus adapters, RAID adapters, SAS expander cards, cables, and accessories.

== Sources ==
- The New York Times: November 2, 1999 – "Adaptec Looks To Strengthen Data-Storage Line"
