= Usb8x =

TI-84 application

Usb8x is a flash application for the TI-84 Plus and TI-84 Plus SE graphing calculators. It is a driver that interfaces with the calculator's built in USB On-The-Go port, allowing developers to easily create their own USB device drivers for use on the calculators. This allows the newfound use of USB peripherals such as a USB mouse, USB keyboard, or a USB flash drive. The programming is available for both TI-BASIC and flash application storage and management.

== Compatibility ==
=== Supported by driver ===
- HID Mouse
- HID Keyboard
- TI Silverlink

=== Compatible; lack driver support ===
- TI-84 Plus
- Vernier EasyTemp
- EMS HID PlayStation 2 Controller Adapter
- Lexar Jumpdrive ("secure edition" works too)
- Canon i850 Printer
- Logitech Precision Gamepad
- Motorola SURFboard cable modem
- Apacer Handy Steno HT202 USB Memory Stick 128MB
- Sony PSP system when enabled as a USB device
- Most other USB Mass storage devices which don't draw much power from the USB Port

=== Not compatible ===
- Ezonics Webcam
- SMC 802.11b Adapter
- Sandisk Cruzer Mini Flash Drive
