= ATAPI =

Protocol that carries SCSI commands over Parallel ATA

ATAPI (ATA Packet Interface) is a protocol used with the Parallel ATA (IDE) and Serial ATA standards so that a greater variety of devices can be connected to a computer than with the ATA command set alone. It carries SCSI commands and responses through the ATA interface.

ATAPI devices include CD-ROM and DVD-ROM drives, tape drives, magneto-optical drives, CompactFlash drives, and large-capacity floppy drives such as the Zip drive and SuperDisk drive.

== History ==
ATA was originally designed for, and worked only with, hard disks and devices that could emulate them. The Small Form Factor Committee (SFF) introduced ATAPI to be used for a variety of other devices that require functions beyond those necessary for hard disks. For example, any removable media device needs a "media eject" command, and a way for the host to determine whether the media is present, and these were not provided in the ATA protocol.

The Small Form Factor committee approached this problem by defining ATAPI as part of the fourth generation of ATA. ATAPI carries SCSI commands through ATA, so ATAPI devices are "speaking SCSI" other than at the electrical interface. In fact, some early ATAPI devices were simply SCSI devices with an ATA/ATAPI to SCSI protocol converter added on. The SCSI commands and responses are embedded in "packets" (hence "ATA Packet Interface") for transmission on the ATA cable. This interfaces ATA with any device class for which a SCSI command set has been defined. ATAPI devices are also "speaking ATA" because the ATA physical interface and protocol are still being used to send the packets.

The Direct Memory Access feature for the ATA interface was introduced along with ATAPI.

== Specification ==
The SCSI commands and responses used by each class of ATAPI device (CD-ROM, tape, etc.) are described in other documents or specifications specific to those device classes and are not within ATA/ATAPI or the T13 committee's purview. One commonly used set is defined in the MMC SCSI command set.

ATAPI was adopted as part of ATA in INCITS 317-1998, AT Attachment with Packet Interface Extension (ATA/ATAPI-4).

== See also ==
- SCSI / ATA Translation – Computer device communications standard
