= SCSI =

Set of computer and peripheral connection standards

SCSI Small Computer System Interface
- Type: Bus

Production history
- Designer: Team led by Larry Boucher at Shugart Associates
- Designed: September 1981; 45 years ago
- Standardized: ANSI X3.131-1986, June 1986
- Produced: Since 1983

Small Computer System Interface (SCSI, /ˈskʌzi/ SKUZ-ee) is a set of standards for physically connecting and transferring data between computers and peripheral devices, best known for its use with storage devices such as hard disk drives. SCSI was introduced in the 1980s and has seen widespread use on servers and high-end workstations, with new SCSI standards being published as recently as SAS-4 in 2017.

The SCSI standards define commands, protocols, electrical, optical and logical interfaces. The SCSI standard defines command sets for specific peripheral device types. The initial Parallel SCSI was most commonly used for hard disk drives and tape drives, but it can connect a wide range of other devices, including scanners and optical disc drives, although not all controllers can handle all devices.

The first SCSI standard, X3.131-1986, generally referred to as SCSI-1, was published by the X3T9 technical committee of the American National Standards Institute (ANSI) in 1986. SCSI-2 was published in August 1990 as X3.T9.2/86-109, with further revisions in 1994 and subsequent adoption of a multitude of interfaces. Further refinements have resulted in improvements in performance and support for ever-increasing data storage capacity.

== History ==
=== Parallel interface ===
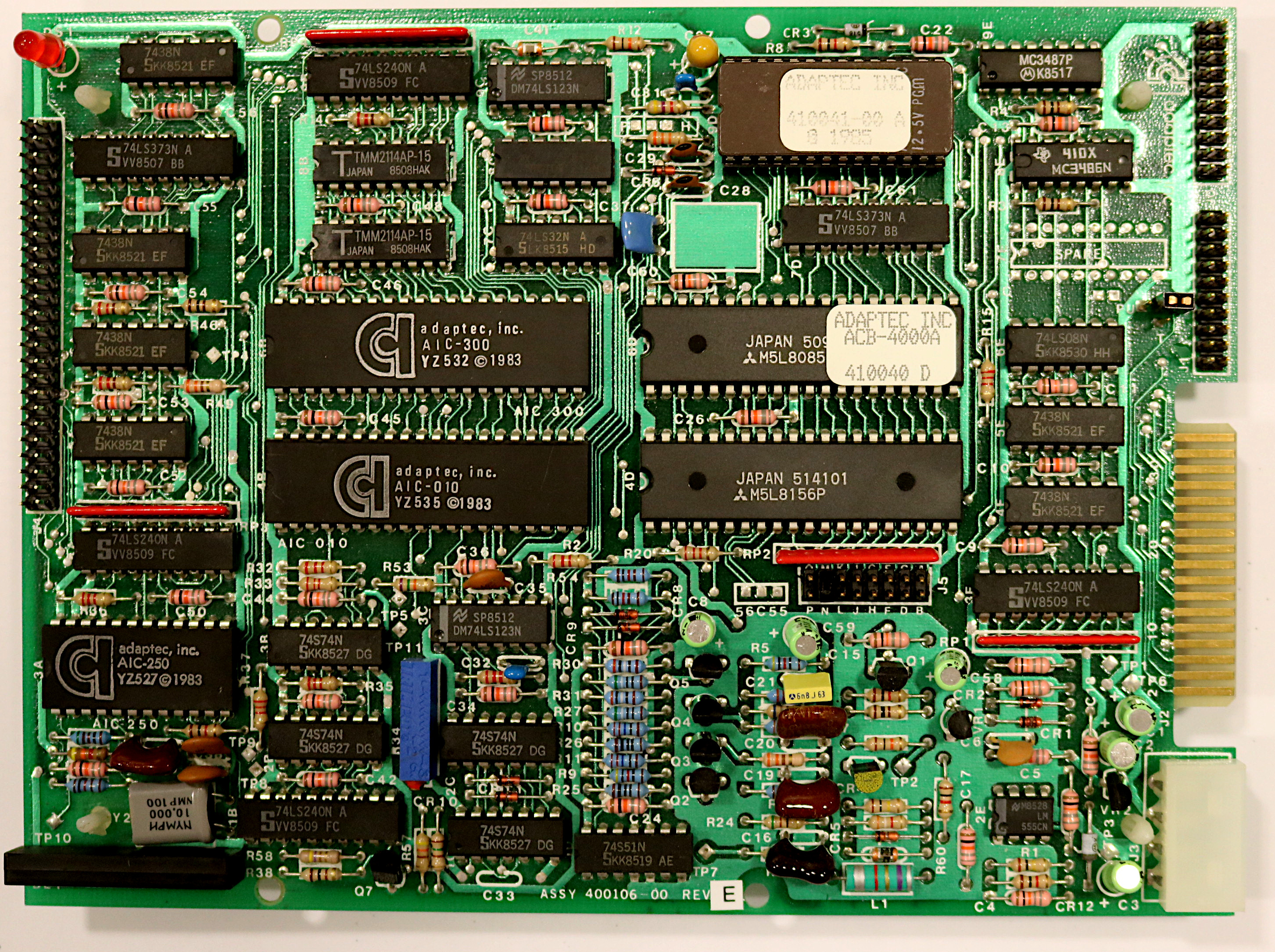
Adaptec ACB-4000A SASI card from 1985

SCSI is derived from the Shugart Associates System Interface (SASI), developed beginning 1979 and publicly disclosed in 1981. Larry Boucher is considered to be the "father" of SASI and ultimately SCSI due to his pioneering work first at Shugart Associates and then at Adaptec, which he founded in 1981.

A SASI controller provided a bridge between a hard disk drive's low-level interface and a host computer, which needed to read blocks of data. SASI controller boards were typically the size of a hard disk drive and were usually physically mounted to the drive's chassis. SASI, which was used in mini- and early microcomputers, defined the interface as using a 50-pin flat ribbon connector, which was adopted as the SCSI-1 connector. SASI is a fully compliant subset of SCSI-1, so that many, if not all, of the then-existing SASI controllers were SCSI-1 compatible.

In around 1980, NCR Corporation had been developing a competing interface standard by the name of BYSE. In the summer of 1981, NCR abandoned its in-house efforts in favor of pursuing SASI and improving on its design for their own computer systems. Fearing that their extension of the SASI standard would induce market confusion, however, NCR briefly cancelled their contract with Shugart. NCR's proposed improvements to the design of SCSI piqued the interest of Optimem, a subsidiary of Shugart, which requested that NCR and Shugart collaborate on a unified standard. In October 1981, the two companies agreed to co-develop SASI and present their standard jointly with ANSI.

Until at least February 1982, ANSI developed the specification as "SASI" and "Shugart Associates System Interface". However, the committee documenting the standard would not allow it to be named after a company. Almost a full day was devoted to agreeing to name the standard "Small Computer System Interface", which Boucher intended to be pronounced "sexy", but ENDL's Dal Allan pronounced the new acronym as "scuzzy" and that stuck.

The NCR facility in Wichita, Kansas developed the industry's first SCSI controller chip, the NCR 5385, released in 1983. According to its developers, the chip worked the first time it was tested. A number of companies, such as Adaptec and Optimem, were early supporters of SCSI. By late 1990 at least 45 manufactures offered 251 models of parallel SCSI host adapters Today, such host adapters have largely been displaced by the faster serial SCSI (SAS) host adapters.

The "small" reference in "small computer system interface" is historical; since the mid-1990s, SCSI has been available on even the largest of computer systems.

Since its standardization in 1986, SCSI has been commonly used in the Amiga, Atari, Apple Macintosh and Sun Microsystems computer lines and PC server systems. Apple started using the less-expensive parallel ATA (PATA, also known as IDE) for its low-end machines with the Macintosh Quadra 630 in 1994, and added it to its high-end desktops starting with the Power Macintosh G3 in 1997. Apple dropped on-board SCSI completely in favor of IDE and FireWire with the (Blue & White) Power Mac G3 in 1999, while still offering a PCI SCSI host adapter as an option on up to the Power Macintosh G4 (AGP Graphics) models. Sun switched its lower-end range to Parallel ATA (PATA) with introduction of their Ultra 5 and 10 low end workstations using CMD640 IDE controller and continued this trend with the later Blade 100 and 150 entry level systems and did not switch to contemporary SATA interface even with the introduction of the Blade 1500 in 2003 while the higher end Blade 2500 released at the same time used Ultra320 Parallel SCSI-3. Sun moved to SATA and SAS interfaces with their last UltraSPARC-III-based workstations in 2006 with the entry-level Ultra 25 and mid-range Ultra 45. Commodore included SCSI on the Amiga 3000/3000T systems and it was an add-on to previous Amiga 500/2000 models. Starting with the Amiga 600/1200/4000 systems, Commodore switched to the IDE interface. Atari included SCSI as standard in its Atari MEGA STE, Atari TT and Atari Falcon computer models. SCSI has never been popular in the low-priced IBM PC world, owing to the lower cost and adequate performance of the ATA hard disk standard. However, SCSI drives and even SCSI RAIDs became common in PC workstations for video or audio production.

=== Modern SCSI ===
Recent physical versions of SCSI‍—‌Serial Attached SCSI (SAS), SCSI-over-Fibre Channel Protocol (FCP), and USB Attached SCSI (UAS)‍—‌break from the traditional parallel SCSI bus and perform data transfer via serial communications using point-to-point links. Although much of the SCSI documentation talks about the parallel interface, all modern development efforts use serial interfaces. Serial interfaces have a number of advantages over parallel SCSI, including higher data rates, simplified cabling, longer reach, improved fault isolation and full-duplex capability. The primary reason for the shift to serial interfaces is the clock skew issue of high-speed parallel interfaces, which makes the faster variants of parallel SCSI susceptible to problems caused by cabling and termination.

The non-physical iSCSI preserves the basic SCSI paradigm, especially the command set, almost unchanged, through embedding of SCSI-3 over TCP/IP. Therefore, iSCSI uses logical connections instead of physical links and can run on top of any network supporting IP. The actual physical links are realized on lower network layers, independently of iSCSI. Predominantly, Ethernet is used, which is also of a serial nature.

SCSI is popular on high-performance workstations, servers, and storage appliances. Almost all RAID subsystems on servers have used some kind of SCSI hard disk drives for decades (initially Parallel SCSI, interim Fibre Channel, recently SAS), though a number of manufacturers offer SATA-based RAID subsystems as a cheaper option. Moreover, SAS offers compatibility with SATA devices, creating a much broader range of options for RAID subsystems together with the existence of nearline SAS (NL-SAS) drives. Instead of SCSI, modern desktop computers and notebooks typically use SATA interfaces for internal hard disk drives, with NVMe over PCIe gaining popularity as SATA can bottleneck modern solid-state drives.

== Interfaces ==
SCSI is available in a variety of interfaces. The first was parallel SCSI (also called SCSI Parallel Interface or SPI), which uses a parallel bus design. Since 2005, SPI has been gradually replaced by Serial Attached SCSI (SAS), which uses a serial design but retains other aspects of the technology. Many other interfaces that do not rely on complete SCSI standards still implement the SCSI command protocol; others drop physical implementation entirely while retaining the SCSI architectural model. iSCSI, for example, uses TCP/IP as a transport mechanism, which is most often transported over Gigabit Ethernet or faster network links.

SCSI interfaces have often been included on computers from various manufacturers for use under Microsoft Windows, classic Mac OS, Unix, Amiga and Linux operating systems, either implemented on the motherboard or by means of plug-in adaptors. With the advent of SAS and SATA drives, provision for parallel SCSI on motherboards was discontinued.

=== Parallel SCSI ===
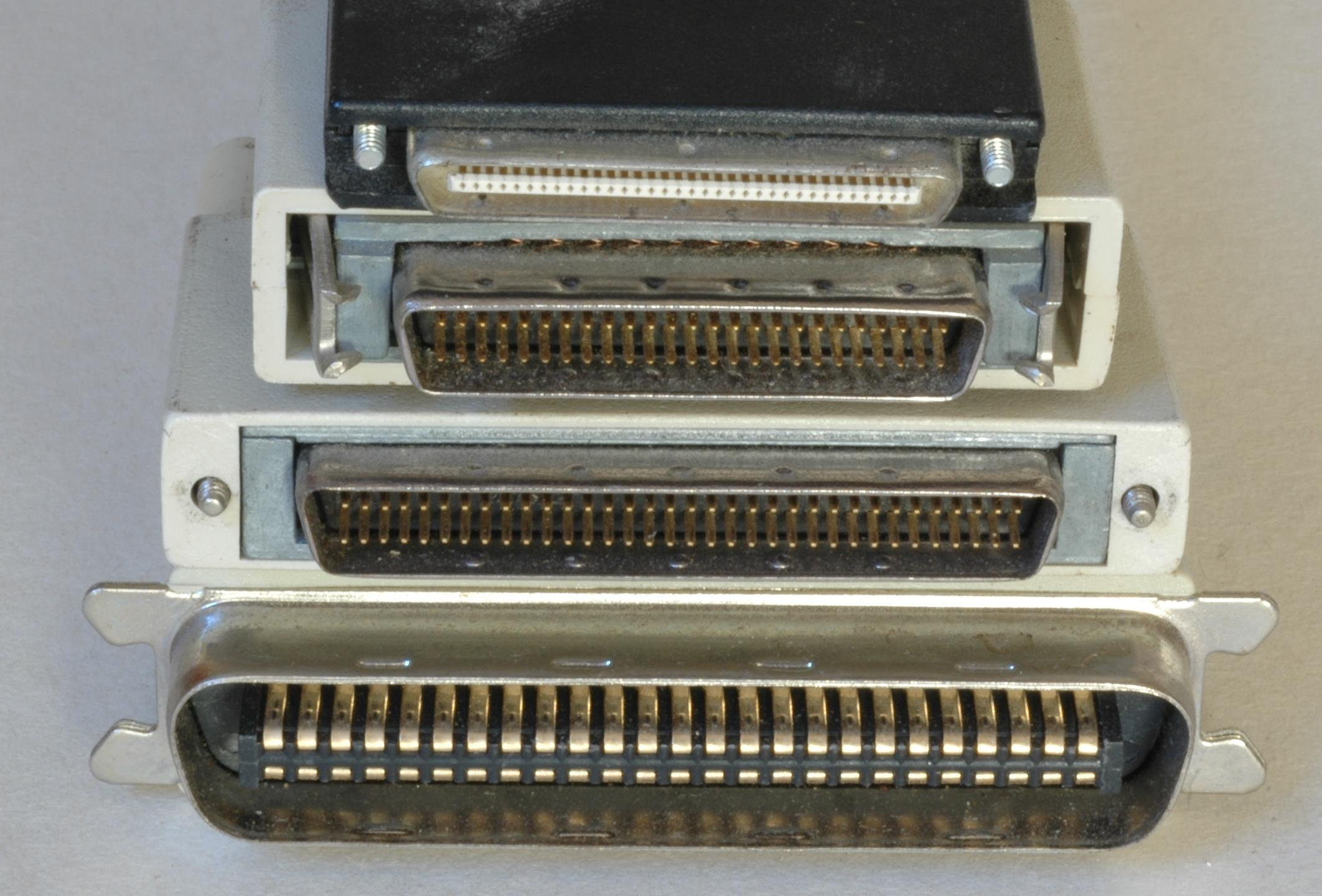
Assorted Parallel SCSI connectors

Initially, the SCSI Parallel Interface (SPI) was the only interface using the SCSI protocol. Its standardization started as a single-ended 8-bit bus in 1986, transferring up to 5 MB/s, and evolved into a low-voltage differential 16-bit bus capable of up to 320 MB/s. The last SPI-5 standard from 2003 also defined a 640 MB/s speed, which failed to be realized.

Parallel SCSI specifications include several synchronous transfer modes for the parallel cable and an asynchronous mode. The asynchronous mode is a classic request/acknowledge protocol, which allows systems with a slow bus or simple systems to also use SCSI devices. Faster synchronous modes are used more frequently.

=== SCSI interfaces ===
Interface	Alternative names	Specification body / document	Width (bits)	Clock (Note: Clock rate in MHz for parallel, or bitrate (per second) for serial interfaces.)	Line code	Maximum		
Interface	Alternative names	Specification body / document	Width (bits)	Clock	Line code	Throughput	Length (Note: For daisy-chain designs, length of bus, from end to end; for point-to-point, length of a single link)	Devices (Note: Including any host adapters (i.e., computers count as a device))
Ultra-320 SCSI	Ultra-4; Fast-160	SPI-5 (INCITS 367-2003)	16	80 MHz DDR	none	320 MB/s (2560 Mbit/s)	12 m	16
SSA	Serial Storage Architecture	T10 / INCITS 309-1997	serial	200 Mbit/s	8b10b	20 MB/s (Note: spatial reuse) (Note: full duplex) (Note: per direction) (160 Mbit/s)	25 m	96
SSA 40	Serial Storage Architecture	T10 / INCITS 309-1997	serial	400 Mbit/s	8b10b	40 MB/s (320 Mbit/s)	25 m	96
Fibre Channel 1 Gbit	1GFC	T11 / X3T11/94-175v0 FC-PH Draft, Revision 4.3	serial	1.0625 Gbit/s	8b10b	98.4 MB/s (850 Mbit/s)	500 m / 10 km (Note: 500 meters for multi-mode, 10 kilometers for single-mode optical fiber)	127 (FC-AL); 2^{24} (FC-SW)
Fibre Channel 2 Gbit	2GFC	T11 / X3T11/96-402v0 FC-PH-2, Rev 7.4	serial	2.125 Gbit/s	8b10b	197 MB/s (1,700 Mbit/s)	500 m / 10 km	127/2^{24}
Fibre Channel 4 Gbit	4GFC	T11 / INCITS Project 2118-D / Rev 6.10	serial	4.25 Gbit/s	8b10b	394 MB/s (3,400 Mbit/s)	500 m / 10 km	127/2^{24}
Fibre Channel 8 Gbit	8GFC	T11 / INCITS Project 2118-D / Rev 6.10	serial	8.5 Gbit/s	8b10b	788 MB/s (6,800 Mbit/s)	500 m / 10 km	127/2^{24}
Fibre Channel 16 Gbit	16GFC	T11 / INCITS Project 2118-D / Rev 6.10	serial	14.025 Gbit/s	64b66b	1,575 MB/s (13,600 Mbit/s)	500 m / 10 km	127/2^{24}
SAS 1.1	Serial attached SCSI	T10 / INCITS 417-2006	serial	3 Gbit/s	8b10b	300 MB/s (2,400 Mbit/s)	6 m	16,256 (Note: 128 per expander)
SAS 2.1	Serial attached SCSI	T10 / INCITS 478-2011	serial	6 Gbit/s	8b10b	600 MB/s (4,800 Mbit/s)	6 m	16,256
SAS 3.0	Serial attached SCSI	T10 / INCITS 519	serial	12 Gbit/s	8b10b	1,200 MB/s (9,600 Mbit/s)	6 m	16,256
SAS 4.0	Serial attached SCSI	T10 / INCITS 534 (draft)	serial	22.5 Gbit/s	128b150b	2,400 MB/s (19,200 Mbit/s)	tbd	16,256
IEEE 1394-2008	Firewire S3200, i.Link, Serial Bus Protocol (SBP)	IEEE Std. 1394-2008	serial	3.145728 Gbit/s	8b10b	315 MB/s (2,517 Mbit/s)	4.5 m	63
SCSI Express	SCSI over PCIe (SOP)	T10 / INCITS 489	serial	8 GT/s (PCIe 3.0)	128b130b	985 MB/s (Note: per PCIe 3.0 lane) (7,877 Mbit/s)	short, backplane only	2^{58}
USB Attached SCSI 2	UAS-2	T10 / INCITS 520	serial	10 Gbit/s (USB 3.1)	128b132b	~1,200 MB/s (~9,500 Mbit/s)	3 m (Note: not specified, practical limitation of USB 3.1)	127
ATAPI over Parallel ATA	ATA Packet Interface	T13 /	16	33 MHz DDR	none	133 MB/s (Note: half duplex) (1,064 Mbit/s)	457 mm (18 inches)	2
ATAPI over Serial ATA	ATA Packet Interface	T13 /	serial	6 Gbit/s	8b10b	600 MB/s (Note: half duplex) (4,800 Mbit/s)	1 m	1 (15 with port multiplier)
iSCSI	Internet Small Computer System Interface, SCSI over IP	IETF / RFC 7143	mostly serial	implementation- and network-dependent		1,187 MB/s (Note: over Ethernet, per 10 Gbit/s, MTU 1500) or 1,239 MB/s (Note: over Ethernet, per 10 Gbit/s, MTU 9000)	implementation- and network-dependent	2^{80} (IPv6 ULA)
SRP	SCSI RDMA Protocol (SCSI over InfiniBand and similar)	T10 / INCITS 365-2002	implementation- and network-dependent					

== Cabling ==
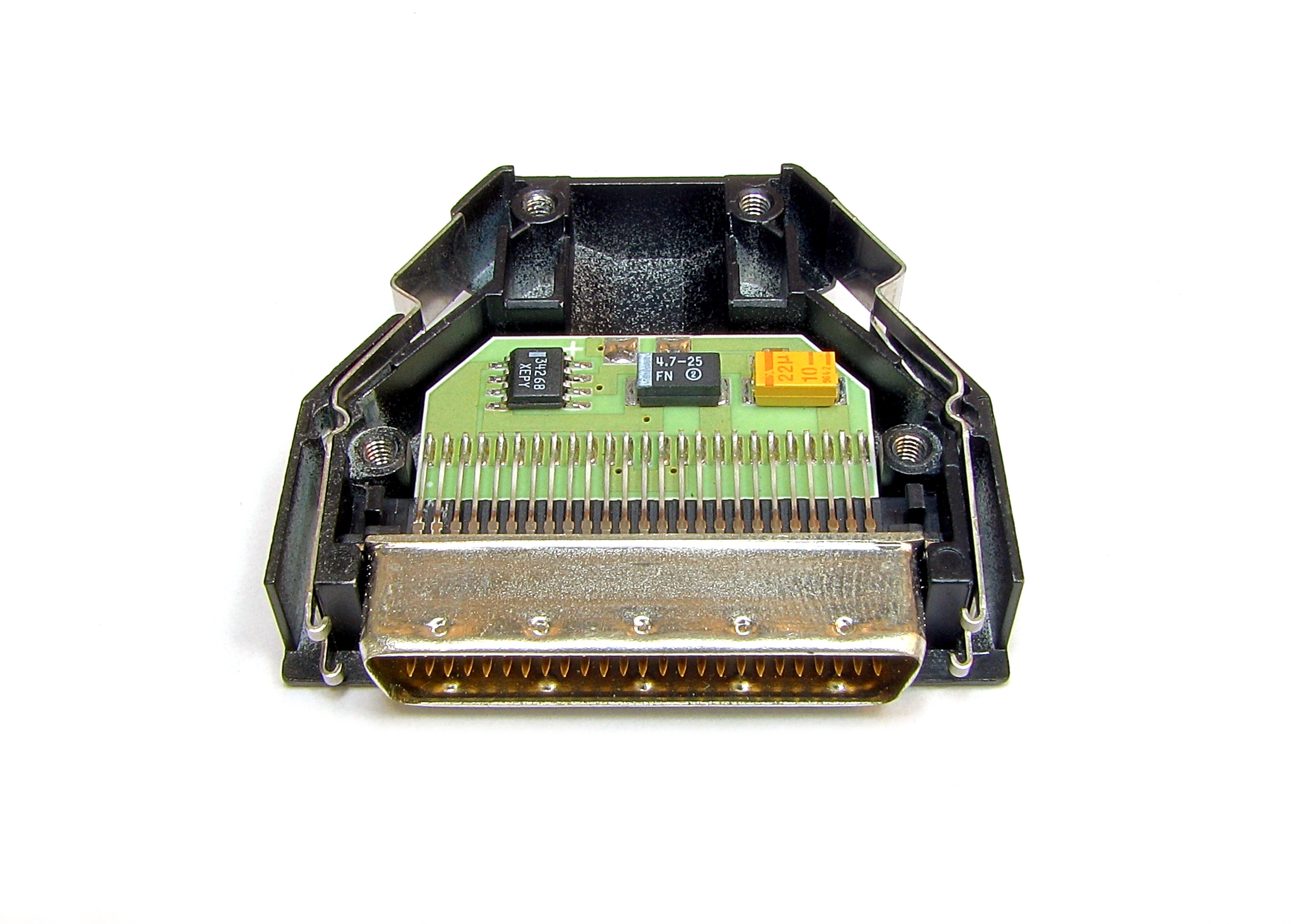
Bus terminator with top cover removed

=== SCSI Parallel Interface ===
Internal parallel SCSI cables are usually ribbons, with two or more 50–, 68–, or 80–pin connectors attached. External cables are typically shielded (but may not be), with 50– or 68–pin connectors at each end, depending upon the specific SCSI bus width supported. The 80–pin Single Connector Attachment (SCA) is typically used for hot-pluggable devices

=== Fibre Channel ===
Fibre Channel can be used to transport SCSI information units, as defined by the Fibre Channel Protocol for SCSI (FCP). These connections are hot-pluggable and are usually implemented with optical fiber.

=== Serial attached SCSI ===
Serial attached SCSI (SAS) uses a modified Serial ATA data and power cable.

=== iSCSI ===
iSCSI (Internet Small Computer System Interface) usually uses Ethernet connectors and cables as its physical transport, but can run over any physical transport capable of transporting IP.

=== SRP ===
The SCSI RDMA Protocol (SRP) is a protocol that specifies how to transport SCSI commands over a reliable RDMA connection. This protocol can run over any RDMA-capable physical transport, e.g. InfiniBand or Ethernet when using RoCE or iWARP.

=== USB Attached SCSI ===
USB Attached SCSI allows SCSI devices to use the Universal Serial Bus.

=== Automation/Drive Interface ===
The Automation/Drive Interface − Transport Protocol (ADT) is used to connect removable media devices, such as tape drives, with the controllers of the libraries (automation devices) in which they are installed. The ADI standard specifies the use of RS-422 for the physical connections. The second-generation ADT-2 standard defines iADT, use of the ADT protocol over IP (Internet Protocol) connections, such as over Ethernet. The Automation/Drive Interface − Commands standards (ADC, ADC-2, and ADC-3) define SCSI commands for these installations.

== SCSI command protocol ==
In addition to many different hardware implementations, the SCSI standards also include an extensive set of command definitions. The SCSI command architecture was originally defined for parallel SCSI buses but has been carried forward with minimal change for use with iSCSI and serial SCSI. Other technologies which use the SCSI command set include the ATA Packet Interface, USB Mass Storage class and FireWire SBP-2.

In SCSI terminology, communication takes place between an initiator and a target. The initiator sends a command to the target, which then responds. SCSI commands are sent in a command descriptor block (CDB). The CDB consists of a one-byte operation code followed by five or more bytes containing command-specific parameters.

At the end of the command sequence, the target returns a status code byte, such as 00h for success, 02h for an error (called a Check Condition), or 08h for busy. When the target returns a Check Condition in response to a command, the initiator usually then issues a SCSI Request Sense command in order to obtain a Key Code Qualifier from the target. The Check Condition and Request Sense sequence involves a special SCSI protocol called a Contingent Allegiance Condition.

There are four categories of SCSI commands: N (non-data), W (writing data from initiator to target), R (reading data), and B (bidirectional). There are about 60 different SCSI commands in total, with the most commonly used being:

- Test unit ready: Queries device to see if it is ready for data transfers (disk spun up, media loaded, etc.).
- Inquiry: Returns basic device information.
- Request sense: Returns any error codes from the previous command that returned an error status.
- Send diagnostic and Receive diagnostic results: runs a simple self-test, or a specialised test defined in a diagnostic page.
- Start/Stop unit: Spins disks up and down, or loads/unloads media (CD, tape, etc.).
- Read capacity: Returns storage capacity.
- Format unit: Prepares a storage medium for use. In a disk, a low-level format will occur. Some tape drives will erase the tape in response to this command.
- Read: (four variants): Reads data from a device.
- Write: (four variants): Writes data to a device.
- Log sense: Returns current information from log pages.
- Mode sense: Returns current device parameters from mode pages.
- Mode select: Sets device parameters in a mode page.

Each device on the SCSI bus is assigned a unique SCSI identification number or ID. Devices may encompass multiple logical units, which are addressed by logical unit number (LUN). Simple devices have just one LUN; more complex devices may have multiple LUNs.

A "direct access" (i.e., disk type) storage device consists of a number of logical blocks, addressed by Logical Block Address (LBA). A typical LBA equates to 512 bytes of storage. The usage of LBAs has evolved over time and so four different command variants are provided for reading and writing data. The Read(6) and Write(6) commands contain a 21-bit LBA address. The Read(10), Read(12), Read Long, Write(10), Write(12), and Write Long commands all contain a 32-bit LBA address plus various other parameter options.

The capacity of a sequential access (i.e., tape-type) device is not specified because it depends, amongst other things, on the length of the tape, which is not identified in a machine-readable way. Read and write operations on a sequential access device begin at the current tape position, not at a specific LBA. The block size on sequential access devices can either be fixed or variable, depending on the specific device. Tape devices such as half-inch 9-track tape, DDS (4 mm tapes physically similar to DAT), Exabyte, etc., support variable block sizes.

== Device identification ==
=== Parallel interface ===
On a parallel SCSI bus, a device (e.g. host adapter, disk drive) is identified by a "SCSI ID", which is a number in the range 0–7 on a narrow bus and in the range 0–15 on a wide bus. On earlier models a physical jumper or switch controls the SCSI ID of the initiator (host adapter). On modern host adapters (since about 1997), doing I/O to the adapter sets the SCSI ID; for example, the adapter often contains an Option ROM (SCSI BIOS) program that runs when the computer boots up and that program has menus that let the operator choose the SCSI ID of the host adapter. Alternatively, the host adapter may come with software that must be installed on the host computer to configure the SCSI ID. The traditional SCSI ID for a host adapter is 7, as that ID has the highest priority during bus arbitration (even on a 16-bit bus).

The SCSI ID of a device in a drive enclosure that has a backplane is set either by jumpers or by the slot in the enclosure the device is installed into, depending on the model of the enclosure. In the latter case, each slot on the enclosure's backplane delivers control signals to the drive to select a unique SCSI ID. A SCSI enclosure without a backplane often has a switch for each drive to choose the drive's SCSI ID. The enclosure is packaged with connectors that must be plugged into the drive where the jumpers are typically located; the switch emulates the necessary jumpers. While there is no standard that makes this work, drive designers typically set up their jumper headers in a consistent format that matches the way that these switches are implemented.

Setting the bootable (or first) hard disk to SCSI ID 0 is an accepted IT community recommendation. SCSI ID 2 is usually set aside for the floppy disk drive, while SCSI ID 3 is typically for a CD-ROM drive.

=== General ===
Note that a SCSI target device (which can be called a physical unit) is sometimes divided into smaller logical units. For example, a high-end disk subsystem may be a single SCSI device but contain dozens of individual disk drives, each of which is a logical unit. Further, a RAID array may be a single SCSI device, but may contain many logical units, each of which is a "virtual" disk—a stripe set or mirror set constructed from portions of real disk drives. The SCSI ID, WWN, etc. in this case identifies the whole subsystem, and a second number, the LUN, identifies a disk device (real or virtual) within the subsystem.

It is quite common, though incorrect, to refer to the logical unit itself as a "LUN". Sometimes, redundantly, the actual LUN may be called a "LUN number" or "LUN id".

In modern SCSI transport protocols, there is an automated process for the "discovery" of the IDs. The SSA initiator (normally the host computer through the host adaptor) "walk the loop" to determine what devices are connected and then assigns each one a 7-bit "hop-count" value. Fibre Channel – Arbitrated Loop (FC-AL) initiators use the LIP (Loop Initialization Protocol) to interrogate each device port for its WWN (World Wide Name). For iSCSI, because of the unlimited scope of the (IP) network, the process is quite complicated. These discovery processes occur at power-on/initialization time and also if the bus topology changes later, for example, if an extra device is added.

SCSI has the CTL (Channel, Target or Physical Unit Number, Logical Unit Number) identification mechanism per host bus adapter, or the HCTL (HBA, Channel, PUN, LUN) identification mechanism; one host adapter may have more than one channel.

== Device Type ==
Device Type is a 5-bit field reported by a SCSI Inquiry Command; it defines SCSI Peripheral Device Types include, in addition to many varieties of storage devices, printers, scanners, communications devices, and a catch-all processor type for devices not otherwise listed. The standard also includes an “unknown” device type (1Fh), used when a LUN does not implement any of the standard SCSI device‑type command sets.

While all SCSI controllers can work with read/write storage devices, i.e. disk and tape, some will not work with some other device types; older controllers are likely to be more limited, sometimes by their driver software, and more Device Types were added as SCSI evolved. Even CD-ROMs are not handled by all controllers.

== SCSI enclosure services ==
In larger SCSI servers, the disk-drive devices are housed in an intelligent enclosure that supports SCSI Enclosure Services (SES). The initiator can communicate with the enclosure using a specialized set of SCSI commands to access power, cooling, and other non-data characteristics.

== See also ==
- Fibre Channel
- List of device bandwidths
- Parallel SCSI
- Serial Attached SCSI
- Intelligent Peripheral Interface

== Bibliography ==
- Field, Gary; Peter Ridge; John Lohmeyer; Gerhard Islinger; Stefan Groll (2000). The Book of SCSI (2nd ed.). No Starch Press. ISBN 978-1-886411-10-4.
