= FICON =

IBM name for ANSI FC-SB-3 protocol

Fibre Channel

Layer 4. Protocol mapping
- LUN masking

Layer 3. Common services

Layer 2. Network
- Fibre Channel fabric Fibre Channel zoning Registered state change notification

Layer 1. Data link
- 8b/10b encoding

Layer 0. Physical

FICON (Fibre Connection) is the IBM proprietary name for the ANSI FC-SB-3 Single-Byte Command Code Sets-3 Mapping Protocol for Fibre Channel (FC) protocol. It is a FC layer 4 protocol used to map both IBM's antecedent (either ESCON or parallel Bus and Tag) channel-to-control-unit cabling infrastructure and protocol onto standard FC services and infrastructure. The topology is fabric utilizing FC switches or directors. Valid rates include 1, 2, 4, 8, 16, and 32 Gigabit per second data rates at distances up to 100 km.

FICON was introduced in 1998 as part of System/390 G5 IBM mainframe. In July 2013, FICON replaced ESCON in new zEnterprise BC12/EC12, and later models, because of FICON's technical superiority (especially its higher performance) and lower cost.

== Protocol internals ==
Each FICON channel port is capable of multiple concurrent data exchanges (a maximum of 32) in full duplex mode. Information for active exchanges is transferred in Fibre Channel sequences mapped as FICON Information Units (IUs) which consist of one to four Fibre Channel frames, only the first of which carries 32 bytes of FICON (FC-SB-3) mapping protocol. Each FICON exchange may transfer one or many such IUs.

FICON channels use five classes of IUs to conduct information transfers between a channel and a control unit. They are: Data, Command, Status, Control, and lastly Link Control. Only a channel port may send Command or Command and Data IUs, while only a control unit port may send Status IUs.

As with prior IBM mainframe channel protocols, there is a concept of a channel to control unit "connection". In its most primitive form, a connection is associated with a single channel program. In practice, a single channel program may result in the establishment of several sequential connections. This normally occurs during periods where data transfers become dormant while waiting for some type of independent device activity to complete (such as the physical positioning of tape or a disk access arm). In such cases, the connection may be closed by action of the device's control unit with the signaling of appropriate status. When the control unit is ready to resume such an interrupted connection, it signals the channel to reconnect and resume the interrupted channel program. By closing temporarily dormant connections, channel and control unit facilities may be better utilized to serve other active channel programs and certain protocol timeouts that might otherwise occur may be avoided.

FICON uses two Fibre Channel exchanges for a channel – control unit connection – one for each direction. So while a Fibre Channel exchange is capable of carrying a command and response on a single exchange, and all other FC-4 protocols work that way, the response to a FICON IU is always on a different exchange from the IU to which it is a response. The two exchanges that implement a connection are called an exchange pair (Note that the concept of the two exchanges being related exists only at the FC-4 layer). While other FC-4s have a single "data structure type" code that characterizes their IUs in Fibre Channel frame headers, FICON has two. One is for IUs from channel to control unit; the other for control unit to channel.

Except for some initialization dialogue that requires stronger synchronization, FICON uses Fibre Channel class of service 3 (Datagram). Thus, at the Fibre Channel physical (FC-2 and below) level, the communication is connectionless, frames and sequences may arrive out of order, and there is no acknowledgement of arrival. But all of that exists at the FC-4 level.

=== Additional CRC ===
The integrity of customer data carried within one or more IUs is protected by a running 32-bit cyclic redundancy check (CRC) contained in the last frame of an IU classified as an ending IU within each data transfer. This is in addition to the standard Fibre Channel CRC used to verify the integrity of each individual FC frame. As such, the FICON CRC has the capability of detecting missing or out of sequence frames/IUs.

== Cables ==
FICON may employ Fibre Channel fiber optic cables with either short wavelength (multi-mode; 62.5 or 50 micrometer core) or long wavelength (single mode; 9 micrometer core). Long wavelength is used in the majority of applications owing to its superior optical power budget and bandwidth. FICON cannot use Copper Fibre Channel cables.

== Usage ==
FICON is used exclusively with computers based on the IBM z/Architecture (current descendant of System/360, System/370, etc.), commonly called mainframes. FICON and its predecessors are the only protocols sufficient to communicate with traditional mainframe peripheral devices, especially for z/OS. However, most mainframe operating systems also support FCP (SCSI command set over Fibre Channel).

FICON is technically quite similar to more popular storage protocols, such as FCP. Both FICON and FCP share levels 1–3 of Fibre Channel specifications. Some administrators argue that FICON offers somewhat easier troubleshooting in mainframe environments, but the inherent technical advantages and disadvantages between FICON and FCP are much alike. Some mainframe-specific setups, such as GDPS, require FICON (or its predecessor ESCON). Mainframe-attached storage, such as IBM's System Storage DS8000, often supports both protocols. The storage is divided into fixed block storage volumes (accessed with FCP) and mainframe-specific CKD/ECKD storage volumes (accessed with FICON and/or ESCON).

== Devices ==
Disk storage products that can be attached via FICON include:

- EMC: Symmetrix, DMX, VMAX, and PowerMax families
- Hewlett Packard Enterprise: XP Storage family
- Hitachi Vantara: Universal Storage Platform, and Virtual Storage Platform
- IBM: Enterprise Storage Server (Shark), DS6000, and DS8000
- Infinidat: InfiniBox
- StorageTek: FlexLine V2Xf/V2X4f SVA

Tape storage facilities include:

- Advanced TS Migrations, Co. zAppliance Solutions VTL and zPDT data exchange
- Bus-Tech(EMC) MAS and MDL Virtual Tape Library
- EMC Disk Library for mainframe (DLm)
- IBM 3584 UltraScalable Tape Library (TS3500)
- IBM TS7680G ProtecTIER Deduplication Gateway for System z
- IBM Virtual Tape Server (VTS)
- Luminex Mainframe Virtual Tape (MVT) and CGX Solutions
- Oracle StorageTek SL3000 and SL8500 Tape Library
- Oracle StorageTek Virtual Storage Manager
- Tributary Systems Storage Director

Hardware Security Module (HSM) products that support FICON include:

- Thales payShield 9000

Switches/directors that support FICON include:

- NOKIA (formerly Alcatel-Lucent) 1830 PSS
- Brocade DCX family
- Brocade M-Series (McDATA)
- Cisco MDS 9000 Series
- EMC Connectrix family (made by Brocade or Cisco)

Managed File Transfer products that support FICON include:

- Alebra Technologies Parallel Data Mover
- Luminex Mainframe Data Integration (MDI) Platform

Other older FICON switching platforms are still in use. These include the McDATA 6064, CNT UMD, and CNT (Inrange) FC/9000. Inrange was acquired by CNT in 2003, CNT was acquired by McDATA in 2005, and in 2007 McDATA was in turn acquired by Brocade Communications Systems. Approximately 80% of FICON directors and switches installed in mainframe environments were Brocade products at the time. McDATA was well established in the mainframe directors space, manufacturing the 9032-3 and 9032-5 ESCON directors for IBM, as well as the FICON Bridge Card. Brocade has many co-patents with IBM for FICON and ESCON technology. Cisco Systems was a relative newcomer to this space, with their first FICON director coming out in 2003.

Other manufacturers producing FICON-compatible equipment include Optica Technologies, and InfoPrint Solutions Company, which offers high-volume printers that can attach via FICON.
