= Yanai (Hebrew surname) =

Yanai (Hebrew: ינאי) is a surname of Hebrew origin. Notable people with this surname include:

- Hagar Yanai (born 1972), Israeli writer
- Itai Yanai (born 1975), Israeli-American biologist
- Michal Yannai (born 1972), Israeli film actress
- Moshe Yanai (born 1949), Israeli electrical engineer
- Shmuel Yanai (1921–2011), Israeli naval commander
- Zvi Yanai (1935–2013), Israeli writer
