= Hitachi G1000 =

Hitachi G1000 may refer to:

- the Hitachi SH-G1000 smartphone
- the Hitachi VSP-G1000 enterprise disk array

See also:

- G1000 (disambiguation)
