= Luminex =

Luminex may refer to:

- Luminex Corporation, a biotech company based in Austin, Texas
- Luminex Software, a data storage company based in Riverside, California
