= Blue Arc =

Blue Arc may refer to

- the Daegu Stadium
- BlueArc - a company manufacturing Network-attached storage devices
