= Xmap =

- XMIND Workbook file extension .xmap
- xMAP (Multi-Analyte Profiling) technology is a multiplex assay format, patented by Luminex Corporation, using a panel of microspheres internally doped with two fluorescent dyes to produce up to 100 different bead identities that can be used in various applications - from HLA genotyping by oligonucleotide probe hybridization to serological profiling e.g. antibody diversity profiling, antibody identification or histocompatibility screen etc
- XMAP is a cloud-based Geographic information system (GIS) produced by Geoxphere Ltd. It was created in 2016 to help Local Government and Business create, view and analyse spatial data.
- XMap.Net mobile app is an application published by App.Net, providing a map to place classified ads for local businesses and services. XMap is the place on your phone to discover what’s hot and noteworthy in your neighborhood.
