= Cofio =

Cofio may refer to:

- Cofio River, Spain;
- Cofio Software;
- Cofio Operating System;
