= Universal Storage Platform =

Enterprise storage array

Hitachi USP
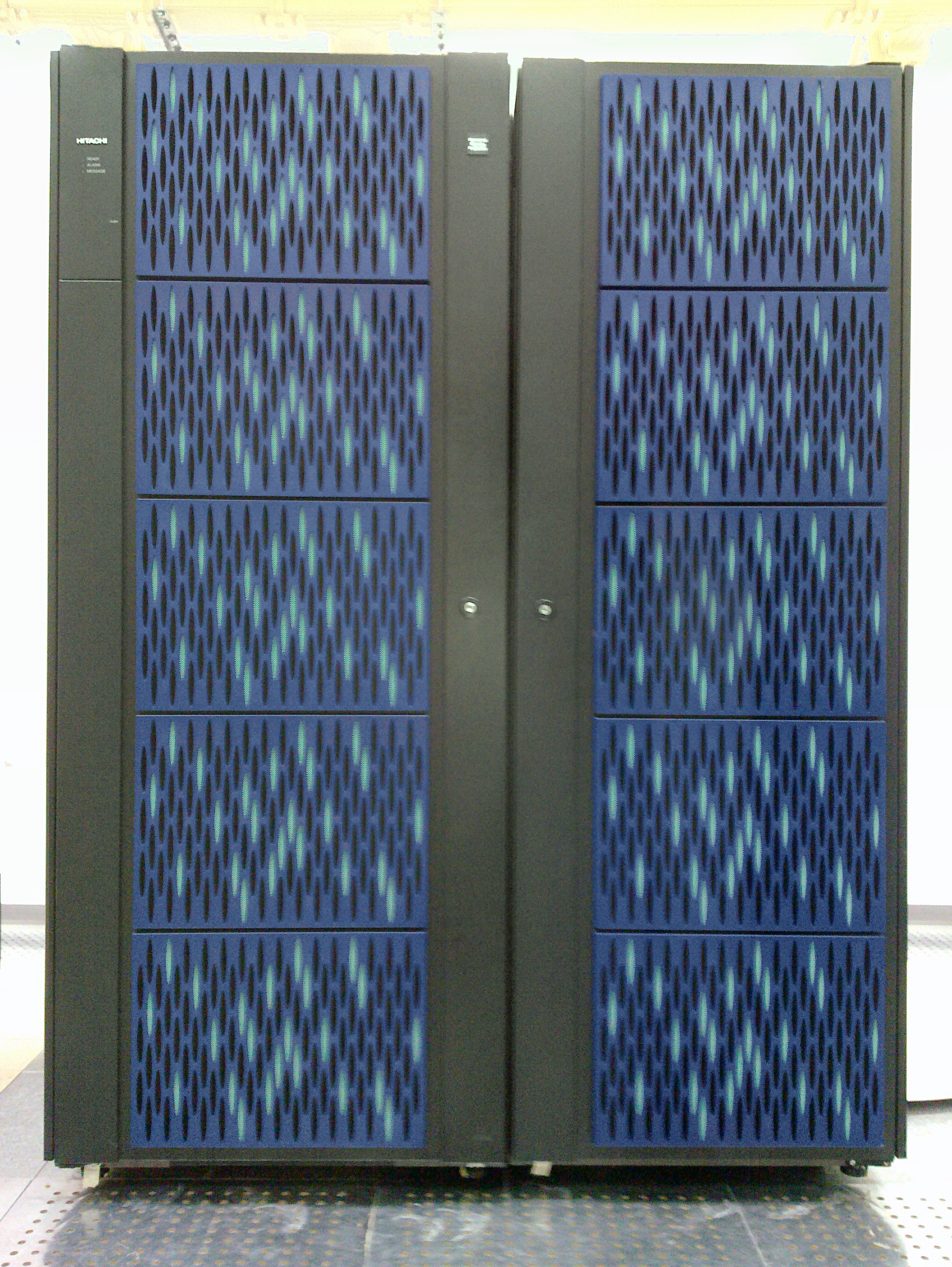
- Hitachi USP R1
- Also known as: Universal Storage Platform
- Developer: Hitachi Data Systems
- Type: Storage server
- Released: 2004; 22 years ago
- Discontinued: 2010
- Successor: Hitachi Virtual Storage Platform

Universal Storage Platform (USP) was the brand name for an Hitachi Data Systems line of computer data storage disk arrays circa 2004 to 2010.

== History ==
The Hitachi Universal Storage Platform was first introduced in 2004. An entry-level enterprise and high-end midrange model, the Network Storage Controller was introduced in 2005. The Universal Storage Platform was one of the first disk arrays to virtualize other disk arrays in the appliance instead of in the network.

The second generation Universal Storage Platform V replaced the original Universal Storage Platform in 2007 and the Universal Storage Platform VM replacing the original Network Storage Controller also in 2007.

== Architecture ==
At the core of the Universal Storage Platform, V and VM was a fully fault tolerant, high performance, non-blocking, silicon based switched architecture designed to provide the bandwidth needed to support infrastructure consolidation of enterprise file and block-based storage services on and behind a single platform.

Notable features included:

- Supported online local and distance replication and migration of data non disruptively internally and between heterogeneous storage, without interrupting application i/o through use of products such as Tiered Storage Manager, ShadowImage, TrueCopy and Universal Replicator.
- Enabled virtualization of external SAN storage from Hitachi and other vendors into one pool
- Storage partitioning provided the ability to host multiple applications on a single storage system without allowing the actions of one set of users to affect the Quality of Service of others.
- Supported thin provisioning and storage reclamation on internal and external virtualized storage
- Provided encryption, WORM and data shredding services, data resilience and business continuity services and content management services.

== Specifications ==
Universal Storage Platform V Specifications

- Frames (Cabinets) - Integrated Control/Drive Group Frame and 1 to 4 optional Drive Group Frames
- Universal Star Network Crossbar Switch - Number of switches 8
- Aggregated bandwidth (GB/sec) - 106
- Aggregated IOPS - Over 4 million
- Cache Memory - Number of cache modules 1-32, Module capacity 8 or 16 GB, Maximum cache memory 512 GB
- Control/Shared Memory - Number of control memory modules 1-8, Module capacity 4 GB, Maximum control memory 28 GB
- Front End Directors (Connectivity)
  - Number of Directors 1-14
  - Fibre Channel host ports per Director - 8 or 16
  - Fibre Channel port performance - 4, 8 Gbit/s
  - Maximum Fibre Channel host ports - 224
  - Virtual host ports - 1,024 per physical port
  - Maximum IBM FICON host ports - 112
  - Maximum IBM ESCON host ports - 112
- Logical Devices (LUNs) — Maximum Supported
  - Open systems 65,536
  - IBM z/OS 65,536
- Disks
  - Type: Flash 73, 146, 200 and 400 GB
  - Type: Fibre Channel 146, 300, 450 and 600 GB
  - Type: SATA II 1 TB, 2 TB
  - Number of disks per system (min/max) 4-1,152
  - Number spare disks per system (min/max) 1-40
- Maximum Internal Raw Capacity - (2 TB disks) 2,268 TB
- Maximum Usable Capacity - RAID-5
  - Open systems (2 TB disks) 1,972 TB
  - z/OS-compatible (1 TB disks) 931 TB
- Maximum Usable Capacity — RAID-6
  - Open systems (2 TB disks) 1,690 TB
  - z/OS-compatible (1 TB disks) 796 TB
- Maximum Usable Capacity — RAID-1+
  - Open systems (2 TB disks) 1,130 TB
  - z/OS-compatible (1 TB disks) 527.4 TB
- Other Features
  - RAID 1, 10, 5, 6 support
  - Maximum internal and external capacity 247PB
  - Virtual Storage Machines 32 max
  - Back end directors 1-8
- Operating System Support
  - Mainframe - Fujitsu: MSP; IBM z/OS, z/OS.e, z/VM, zVSE, TPF; Red Hat; Linux for IBM S/390 and zSeries; SUSE: Linux Enterprise Server for System z.
  - Open systems - HP: HP-UX, Tru64 UNIX, Open VMS; IBM AIX; Microsoft Windows Server 2000, 2003, 2008; Novell NetWare; SUSE Linux Enterprise Server; Red Hat Enterprise Linux; SGI IRIX; Sun Microsystems Solaris; VMware ESX and Vsphere, Citrix XENserver

== Storage management ==
The Hitachi Storage Command Suite (formerly the HiCommand Storage Management Suite) provided integrated storage resource management, tiered storage and business continuity software solutions allowed customers to align their storage with application requirements based upon metrics including Quality-of-Service, Service Level Objectives, Recovery Time Objectives and Recovery Point Objectives.

Open Standards management interfaces such as SNMP and SMI-S were also supported.

== Models ==
Universal Storage Platform family models. Information taken from

Model	Status	Released	Total Internal/External Raw capacity
Universal Storage Platform	Discontinued	2004	13PB
Network Storage Controller	Discontinued	2005	13PB
Universal Storage Platform V	Discontinued	2008	332PB
Universal Storage Platform VM	Discontinued	2008	332PB

== See also ==
- HPE XP
