= VMAX =

VMAX, Vmax or V_{max} may refer to:

== V_{max} (maximum voltage/velocity) ==
- V_{max}, the maximum voltage attained in the action potential.
- V_{max}, maximum aortic velocity, the maximum speed of blood flow in the aorta of the heart, also less commonly noted as AoV_{max}
- Maximal rate in Michaelis–Menten kinetics
- See V Speeds for aircraft speeds

== VMAX, V-Max or Vmax ==
- Yamaha V-Max and VMAX, motorcycles
- VMAX, a data storage product line from EMC Corporation (later Dell EMC)
- Maximum Velocity (V-Max), an Italian movie
- Vmax cinemas of Event Cinemas and Village Cinemas, features larger screens and enhanced visual and audio quality
- VMaX (Véhicule Manœuvrant Expérimental) a French hypersonic glide vehicle
- VMax, a type of Pokémon card introduced in Sword and Shield
- V-Max, a location repeatedly mentioned in Spider-Man: Brand New Day
