= GPANG =

South Korean mobile game service

GPANG (Korean: 지팡) was a 3D mobile game service introduced in 2004 by the Korean provider KTF. This service allowed subscribers to access a downloadable game portal and play advanced 3D mobile games, including MMOs. KTF's GPANG competed with SK Telecom's own 3D mobile game service called GXG. On June 1 2009, GPANG ceased to exist.

== Compatible devices ==
- LG KV3600 (2005)
- Samsung SPH-G1000 (2005)
- Samsung SPH-B3200 (2006)

== Games ==
72 released games are known to exist, with 1 unreleased game.

== See also ==
- GXG
- N-Gage
