= G1000 (disambiguation) =

G1000 may refer to:

- Le G1000, a citizens' assembly in Belgium
- Garmin G1000, an integrated flight instrument system
- Vossloh G1000 BB, a class of diesel-hydraulic locomotives
- Samsung SPH-G1000, is a gaming phone introduced by Samsung

See also:

- Hitachi G1000 (disambiguation)
