= Luminex Software =

American software company

Luminex Software, Inc.
- Industry: Mainframe connectivity, storage and data protection
- Founded: 1994
- Headquarters: Riverside, California, United States
- Area served: Worldwide
- Products: Channel Gateway (CGX); Mainframe Virtual Tape (MVT) product family; Mainframe Data Integration (MDI) product family; DataWARE
- Services: Tape Migration; Tape Analyses; JCL Conversion
- Website: www.luminex.com

Luminex Software, Inc. is a developer and provider of mainframe connectivity, storage and data protection solutions, including virtual tape and data integration products.

== History ==
Luminex was founded in 1994 by Brian Hawley, Michael Saunders and Arthur Tolsma.

In 2000, Luminex acquired and merged the Data|WARE product line and technical staff. Then in 2002, Luminex acquired and merged the Polaris product line and technical staff.

In 2007, Luminex and Data Domain announced a partnership to provide virtual tape library solutions with deduplication for mainframes.

== Products ==
Channel Gateway (CGX) is mainframe virtual tape controller software and hardware (together, an "MVT controller") that provides mainframe access to disk-based open systems storage by acting as tape control units and presenting the storage as "virtual" tape drives (emulating IBM 3490/3590) via FICON or ESCON channels. As tape controllers, CGX require access to a storage target(s) for virtual tape storage. Configurations include either NFS or Fibre Channel connectivity to open systems storage systems.

Mainframe Virtual Tape (MVT) is a family of products that are composed of one or more MVT controllers as well as internal SAS (MVTi) or Fibre Channel attached (MVTe) storage. The number of controllers in an MVT configuration is a dependent on the users' availability and throughput requirements. MVT supports System Z, Z/VM and VSE.

Mainframe Data Integration (MDI) is a family of products that provide mainframe data movement, sharing and co-processing with distributed systems. MDI solutions consist of core MDI software that resides on a dedicated appliance ("MDI Platform") or an MVT controller, host software and optional "Profiles" that provide specific functionality. The MDI/MVT hardware resides between the mainframe, connected via FICON, and distributed systems, connected via 1 or 10 GbE, providing DMZ, data translation/conversion, and protocol negotiation duties. MDI Profiles include SecureTransfer (managed file transfer), BigData Transfer (webHDFS connectivity), Cross-Platform Data Sharing (NFS connectivity, data and workload sharing), zKonnect (Kafka publishing/subscribing) and SAS Language Processor (off-host SAS language processing, including MXG). MDI supports System Z.

DataStream Intelligence, a feature of CGX, separates virtual tape data and metadata inline, achieving higher compression rates. Deduplication rates, when written to storage with deduplication capabilities, such as IBM ProtecTIER, HP StorOnce, Quantum DXi and EMC Data Domain systems, achieve data compression rates upwards of 20:1 versus traditional tape hardware compression of 3:1. For CloudTAPE users, DataStream Intelligence also collects VOLSER metadata, such as creation/replication dates, tape size and tape label (DSN), and adds it to the stored object’s metadata, enabling it to be leveraged by cloud-based applications.

Data|WARE is a family of products that provide optical-based nearline data access, distribution, publishing and archiving for mainframe and UNIX environments.

== Operations ==
In February, 2008, Luminex Software partnered with Terasystem S.p.A., the largest data storage system integrator in Italy, as its full service channel partner for its ground breaking Channel Gateway products in Italy, Spain and Portugal.
