= ESCON =

IBM data connection

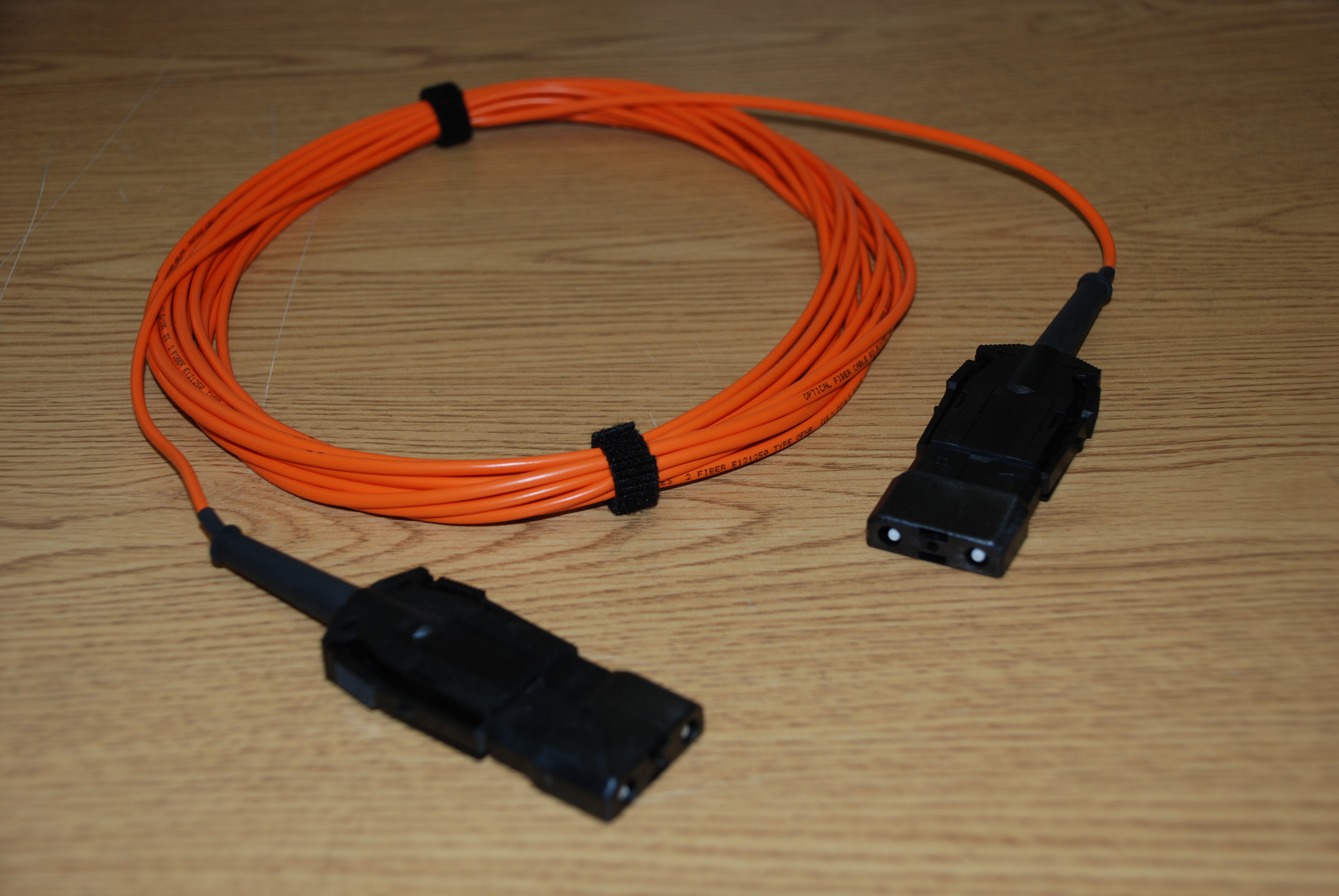
ESCON cable with connectors

ESCON (Enterprise Systems Connection) is a data connection created by IBM, and is commonly used to connect their mainframe computers to peripheral devices such as disk storage, tape drives and IBM 3270 display controllers. ESCON is an optical fiber, half-duplex, serial interface. It originally operated at a rate of 10 MB/s, which was later increased to 17 MB/s. The current maximum distance is 43 kilometers.

IBM introduced ESCON in September 1990 as part of its System/390 announcement. It replaced the older, slower (4.5 MB/s), copper-based, parallel, IBM System/360 Bus and Tag channels technology of 1960-1990 era mainframes. Optical fiber is smaller in diameter and weight, and hence could save installation costs. Space and labor could also be reduced when fewer physical links were required - due to ESCON's switching features. ESCON is being supplanted by the substantially faster FICON, which runs over Fibre Channel.

ESCON allows the establishment and reconfiguration of channel connections dynamically, without having to take equipment off-line and manually move the cables. ESCON supports channel connections using serial transmission over a pair of fibers. The ESCON Director supports dynamic switching (which could be achieved prior to ESCON, but not with IBM-only products). It also allows the distance between units to be extended up to 60 km over a dedicated fiber. "Permanent virtual circuits" are supported through the switch.

ESCON switching has advantages over a collection of point-to-point links. A peripheral previously capable of accessing a single mainframe can now be connected simultaneously to up to eight mainframes, providing peripheral sharing.

The ESCON interface specifications were adopted as ANSI X3.296:1997 by the ANSI X3T11 committee.

== See also ==
- Direct access storage device (DASD)
- Most important DASD (disk arrays) with ESCON interfaces:
  - EMC Symmetrix, DMX and VMAX families.
  - Hewlett Packard Enterprise XP Storage family.
  - Hitachi Data Systems Lightning
  - IBM Enterprise Storage Server (Shark)
  - IBM Storage DS8000
  - Sun StorageTek SVA
