= HPE XP =

Enterprise storage array

The HPE Storageworks XP (XP = eXtended Platform) is a computer data storage disk array sold by Hewlett Packard Enterprise using Hitachi Data Systems hardware and adding their own software to it. It's based on the Hitachi Virtual Storage Platform (VSP) and targeted towards enabling large scale consolidation, large database, Oracle, SAP, Exchange, and online transaction processing (OLTP) environments.

== The XP Disk Array family ==
Used to be called P9000 XP, to match with other disk array products they sold at the time (P2000, P4000, P6000 and P10000).

=== XP 48 ===
- RAID 0/1 and RAID 5 support
- 18 GB 15,000 RPM, 73 GB 10,000 rpm and 181 GB 7,200 rpm Fibre Channel drives
- Crossbar Architecture (3.2 GB/s)
- High capacity scalability—up to 48 disks, 8.7 TB and 24 host connectivity ports
- up to 16 GiB of battery-protected (48 hours minimum), mirrored write cache

=== XP 128 ===
- a mixture of disk drives configured as RAID 1 (2D+2D and 4D+4D) and RAID 5 (3D+1P and 7D+1P).
- from 5 drives to 128 for up to 36 TB of usable storage capacity, 4 drives at a time
- heterogeneous connectivity via Fibre Channel, iSCSI, FICON and ESCON
- all the software functionality of the larger XP 1024 with a smaller footprint.
- up to 64 GiB of battery-protected (48 hours minimum), mirrored write cache

=== XP 256 ===
- RAID 0/1 and RAID 5 support
- from 17 GB to 9 TB of storage space
- connectivity via SCSI (8 to 32 ports) or Fibre Channel (4 to 16 ports)
- up to 16 GiB of battery-protected (48 hours minimum), mirrored write cache

=== XP 512 ===
- RAID 0/1 and RAID 5 support
- 18 GB, 15,000 rpm, 73 GB 10,000 rpm and 181 GB 7,200 rpm Fibre Channel drives
- High capacity scalability—up to 512 disks, 93 TB and 32 host connections
- up to 32 GiB battery-protected, mirrored write cache

=== XP 1024 ===
- a mixture of disk drives configured as RAID 1 (2D+2D and 4D+4D) and RAID 5 (3D+1P and 7D+1P).
- up to 1024 disk drives for 288 GB to 149 TB raw and 144 TB to 129 TB of usable storage capacity in a single array
- heterogeneous connectivity via Fibre Channel, iSCSI, FICON and ESCON
- up to 128 GiB battery-protected (48 hours minimum), mirrored write cache

=== XP 10000 ===
- a mixture of disk drives configured as RAID 1 (2D+2D and 4D+4D), RAID 5 (3D+1P and 7D+1P) and RAID 6 (6D+2P)
- up to 240 disk drives for 69 TB of capacity
- virtualization technology provides external storage device support to enable tiered storage up to 16 PB

=== XP 12000 ===
- OEM product from Hitachi Tagmastore USP 1100
- a mixture of disk drives configured as RAID 1 (2D+2D and 4D+4D), RAID 5 (3D+1P and 7D+1P) and RAID 6 (6D+2P)
- from 9 to 1152 disk drives for 576 GB to over 332 TB of internal capacity
- virtualization technology provides external storage device support to enable tiered storage up to 32 PB
- up to 128 GiB battery-protected (48 hours minimum), mirrored write cache
- double the internal performance of the XP1024

=== XP 20000 ===
- a mixture of disk drives configured as RAID 1 (2D+2D and 4D+4D), RAID 5 (3D+1P, 7D+1P, 14D+2P and 28D+4P) and RAID 6 (6D+2P)
- up to 240 disk drives for 177 TB of raw capacity
- up to 64 GiB battery-protected (48 hours minimum), mirrored write cache
- virtualization technology provides external storage device support to enable tiered storage up to 96 PB

=== XP 24000 ===
A mixture of disk drives configured as RAID 1 (2D+2D and 4D+4D), RAID 5 (3D+1P, 7D+1P, 14D+2P and 28D+4P) and RAID 6 (6D+2P) from 9 to 1152 disk drives for 2.26 PB Raw space. (Used at Cloud At Cost)

=== P9500 ===
- a mixture of Serial attached SCSI (SAS) and midline SAS disk drives configured as RAID 1 (2D+2D and 4D+4D), RAID 5 (3D+1P, 7D+1P, 14D+2P and 28D+4P) and RAID 6 (6D+2P)
- from 5 – 2048 disk drives for 2 PB of raw capacity
- up to 1 TiB flash-protected (backup will last indefinitely), mirrored write cache
- No entry-level model any more – P9500 scales from small to large
- Minimum configuration is a whole rack containing SFF SAS drive chassis, proprietary SSD drive chassis, SAN network controller, cache module, batteries, power supplies, fans, management server
- Based on Hitachi VSP F710I

At some point models are the XP 20000, XP24000 and the P9500.

=== XP7 ===
- supports RAID 1, RAID 5 and RAID 6
- supports up to 8PB raw capacity and up to 2304 disks (SFF, LFF, SSD, Flash-Modul SAS)
- up to 2 TiB cache
- up to 247 PB external storage

=== XP8 ===
- supports RAID 1, RAID 5 and RAID 6
- supports up to 69PB raw capacity with several disk formats(SFF, LFF, SSD, Flash-Modul SAS, SCM, NVMe SFF)
- up to 6 TiB cache
- up to 255 PB external storage

==== XP8 Gen2 ====
- FC NVMe front-End
- over 33 million IOPS, a 50% increase over the previous generation
- dedicated hardware compression accelerator, improves the efficiency by 20%
- latency reduced from 70 microseconds to <40
