= Bus and Tag =

IBM peripheral interface

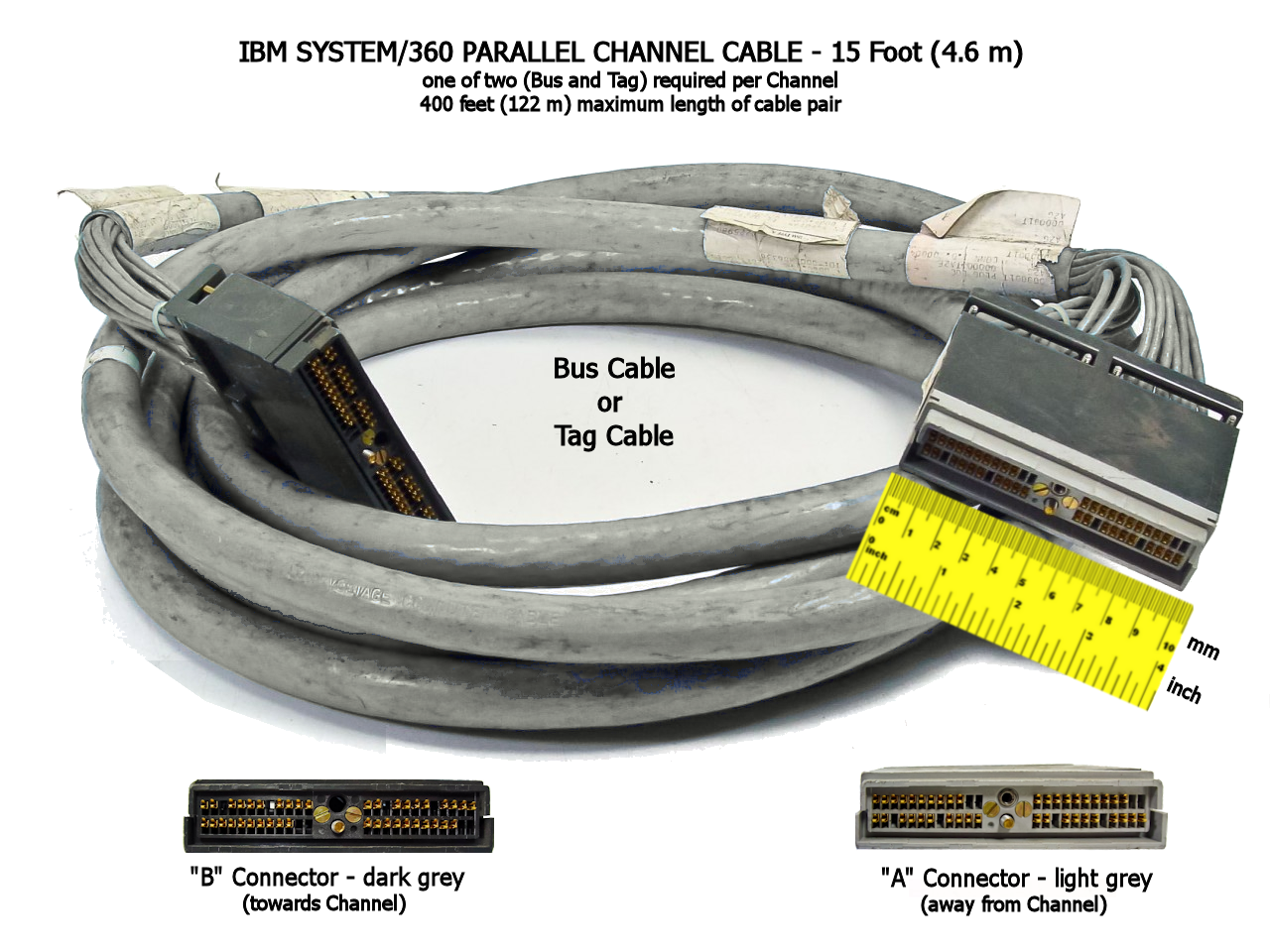
Bus and tag cables

Bus and Tag is an IBM standard for a computer peripheral interface, and was commonly used to connect their mainframe computers to peripheral devices such as line printers, disk storage, magnetic tape drives and IBM 3270 display controllers. The technology uses two or three sets of thick, multi-connector copper cables, one or two sets, carrying data, called the bus, and the other set, carrying control information, called the tag.

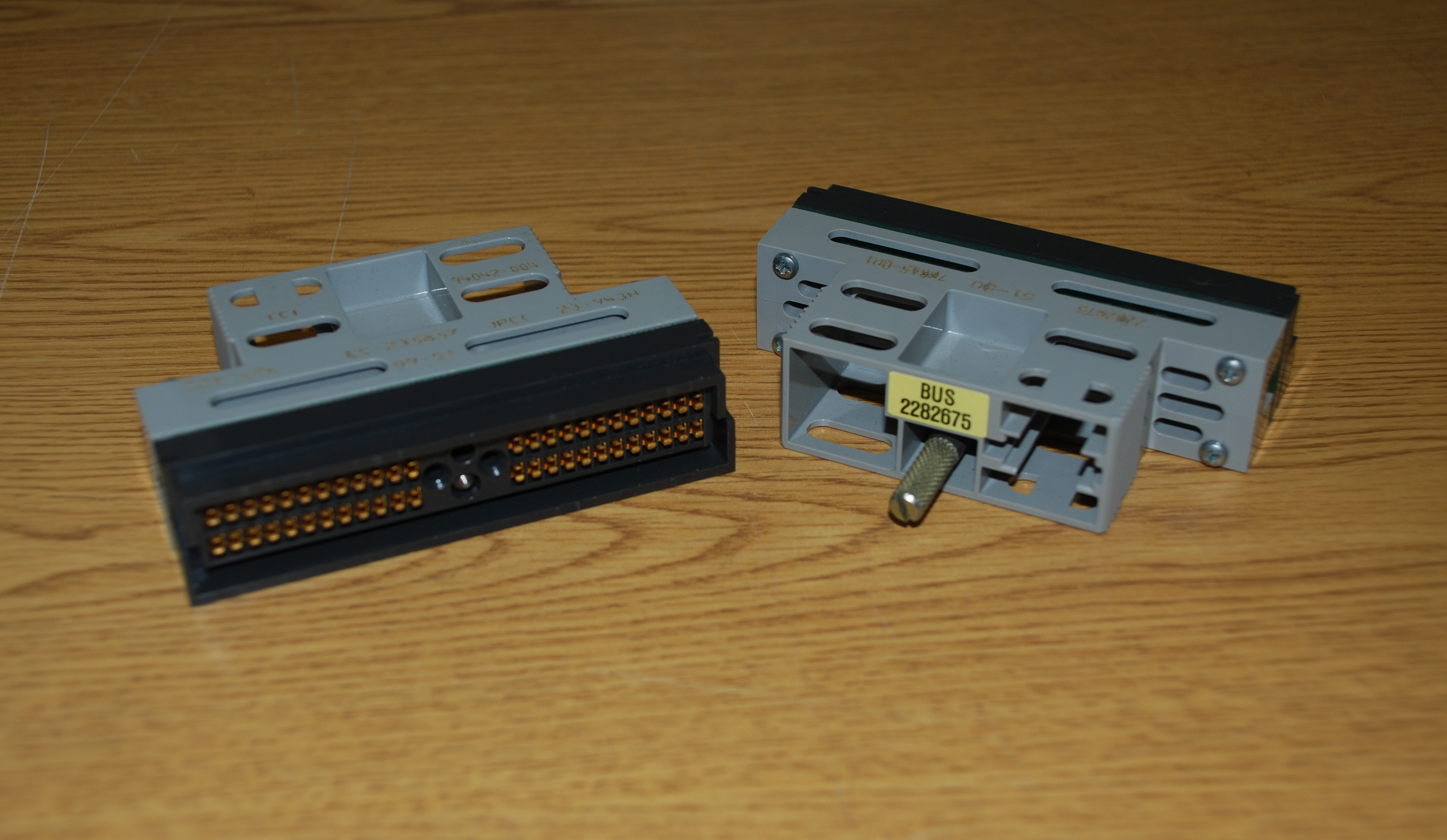
Bus and tag terminator blocks

Bus and Tag cables are daisy chained; and one interface can attach up to eight peripheral control units. The last control unit in the chain must have a terminator plug. Each control unit can attach a unit-specific maximum number of devices, typically sixteen. There is an architectural limit of 256 devices for the interface, and initially a limitation of 200 feet (61 m), later extended to 400 feet (120 m), between the mainframe and the control unit. Bus and Tag channels handle data rates up to 4.5 MB per second. Only one device can transfer data at a time.

Bus and Tag was also used by other computer manufacturers to attach IBM peripherals to their systems. It was later published by the US National Technical Information Service (NTIS) as FIPS PUB 60-2, I/O Channel Interface.

Bus and Tag was introduced with System/360 in 1964, and was also used with System/370. With the introduction of serial, fiber optic ESCON in the 1990s, Bus and Tag channels were re-christened parallel channels, and were gradually superseded. Parallel channels are not available on newer mainframes and are slowly being displaced on older systems. Equipment is available to allow connection of older devices using Bus and Tag to mainframe FICON or ESCON channels.

== Evolution ==
Originally, the System/360 had two types of channel: the byte multiplexer channel and the selector channel. Since that time, there have been several extensions to the channel architecture.

In 1970, IBM announced the 2880 block multiplexer channel for the 360/85 and 360/195, in support of the IBM 2305 fixed head disk. This channel supports disconnected command chaining, which allows a high-speed device to free the channel when performing a requested operation, without terminating the channel program. This channel also has an optional two-byte bus-extension feature, which allows a second bus cable in order to operate at 3.0 MB/s. In the same year, IBM announced the System/370, which included block multiplexer channels.

As DASD became faster, the original channel protocols could not support the required transfer rates, and the two-byte interface was too expensive. As a solution, IBM offered data streaming initially supporting 3.0 MB/s and eventually supporting 4.5 MB/s.

== Example ==
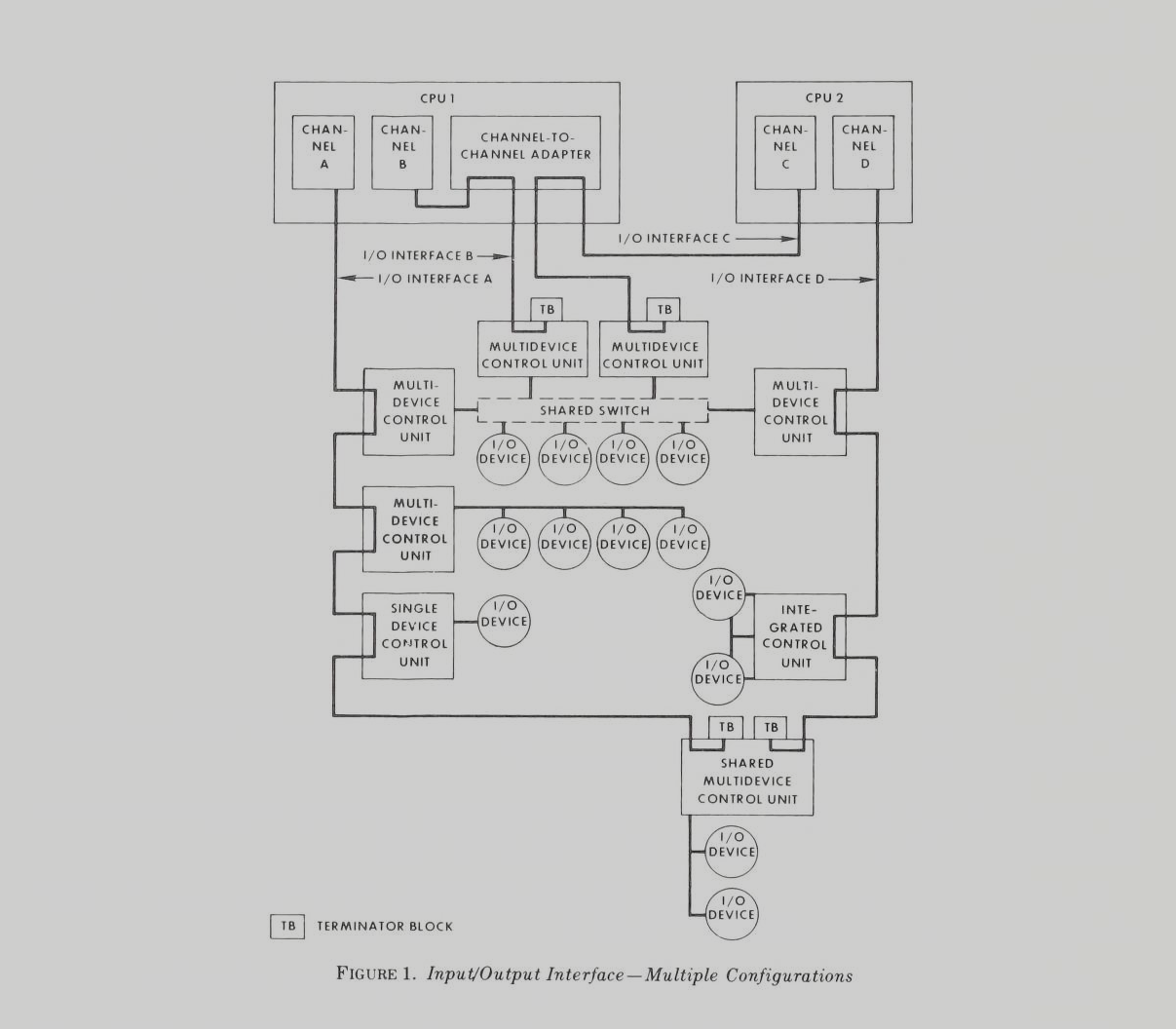
The following schematic shows a complex system with two CPUs and multiple peripherals connected using bus and tag cabling.
