= NetVault Backup =

Backup software

Netvault Backup
- Developer: Quest Software
- Stable release: 12.4 / Sep 2019
- Operating system: Windows, Linux, UNIX, Mac OS X, BSD
- Type: Backup
- License: Proprietary
- Website: www.quest.com/products/netvault-backup/%20https://www.quest.com/products/netvault-backup/

NetVault is a set of data protection software developed and supported by Quest Software. NetVault Backup is a backup and recovery software product. It can be used to protect data and software applications in physical and virtual environments from one central management interface. It supports many servers, application platforms, and protocols such as UNIX, Linux, Microsoft Windows, VMware, Microsoft Hyper-V, Oracle, Sybase, Microsoft SQL Server, NDMP, Oracle ACSLS, IBM DAS/ACI, Microsoft Exchange Server, DB2, and Teradata.

Quest Software offers data deduplication, and protection for NAS filers (NDMP).

== Offerings/Features/Usage ==
NetVault Backup is based on a client-server architecture. A central NetVault Backup Server provides the job management, media management, device management, client management, reporting, notifications, and logging functions. The NetVault Backup Server maintains a history of backups in the NetVault Backup database enabling users to identify the object(s) they want to restore. NetVault Clients are “agents” that work with the NetVault Backup Server to back up and recover the respective servers, applications, and data. The client software is installed on each machine to be protected. The NetVault WebUI enables centralized administration of a NetVault Backup Server from any browser.

NetVault supports tape drives, tape libraries, and other backup devices attached to the central server itself, or to a protected machine located anywhere on the network enabling LAN-free backups. Additionally, devices can be controlled through NDMP if they are attached to a supported filer.

The NetVault Backup Server (the master backup server) can be deployed on Microsoft Windows or Linux.

== Platform and application support ==
NetVault Backup can protect Windows Server, Linux, Solaris, FreeBSD, AIX, HP-UX, Hyper-V, and VMware. It also can back up a variety of applications and NAS devices (NDMP) using so-called Plug-ins. The list includes Microsoft SQL Server, Oracle, Microsoft Exchange Server, Lotus Notes, IBM Db2, Sybase, and others.

== Components ==
There are three options within the NetVault suite, enabling backup and recovery to disk or tape, bare metal recovery (BMR), and data deduplication:

- NetVault Backup is a cross-platform backup and recovery software product. It can be used to back up and recover data and applications in physical and virtual environments from one central management interface. eWEEK wrote that NetVault's broad platform support is its “primary strength.” For example, NetVault has been ported to Mac OS X. “This makes it a good choice for IT managers who want to back up their data to Apple servers.”
- NetVault SmartDisk Data Deduplication offers disk-based backup, data compression, and data deduplication to reduce the backend storage footprint. It uses byte-level, variable block-based software deduplication and is hardware-agnostic, so no specialized drives or appliances are needed.
- NetVault Bare Metal Recovery enables users to restore a computer from its "bare metal" state—including the necessary operating system, network settings, system settings, applications, disk partitions, and data.

== NetApp options ==
Quest supports NetApp products with the following technologies:

- SnapMirror to Tape – Working in conjunction with the NetApp’s SnapMirror technology, NetVault SnapMirror to Tape enables full volumes on filers to be mirrored and backed up to tape to provide the ability to store data offsite for disaster recovery.
- SnapVault Manager – SnapVault Manager provides a graphical interface that is integrated with NetVault Backup to provide a single point of enterprise-wide control of NetApp’s SnapVault. This allows organizations to back up changed data from multiple storage platforms to a common Snapshot target on NetApp appliances.
- Snapshot Manager – The NetVault NDMP Snapshot Manager allows organizations to generate, automatically schedule and recover snapshots through NetVault’s GUI.

== Disk targets ==
Originally NetVault Backup was intended to back up to physical tapes in tape drives. However, the product was soon extended to support backup to disk.

For data deduplication, NetVault Backup supports Quest's DR appliance and NetVault SmartDisk.

The Dell DR appliance is a hardware-based, inline deduplication storage product. Its deduplication engine was originally developed by Ocarina Networks. The NetVault and Ocarina engineering teams worked to integrate the two technologies.

NetVault Backup can also be used with NetVault SmartDisk, which is a disk storage repository and deduplication product. NetVault SmartDisk can perform post-process data deduplication. It represents a contiguous storage pool on disk without being subdivided into virtual tapes or slots for easier management and allows for byte-level, variable block-based software deduplication.

NetVault Backup supports EMC Data Domain via DD Boost and Quantum DXi.

For LAN-free backups, NetVault Backup can write to a physical tape drive or VTL that is shared between multiple machines using Fibre Channel or iSCSI.

== History ==
- 1989: The NetVault product was originally a product developed by AT&T for internal use.
- 1992: AT&T contracted UK company Willow Ltd to provide tape library support. At that time, NetVault Backup was at version 2.0. Willow Ltd added Tape Library management, a Graphical User Interface and heterogeneous platform support.
- 1996: AT&T spun off the NetVault product into a separate private company, CommVault, through a management buyout. At the time, CommVault’s Galaxy product was primarily an optical archiving product and used some of NetVault's tape library support within it. CommVault and Willow Ltd could not agree the term for the buyout of NetVault. They eventually agreed a deal whereby CommVault would no longer be committed to the development contract with Willow Ltd. CommVault would have the right to license the NetVault media/device manager and Willow Ltd would have full ownership of the NetVault source code.
- 1997: The re-architecture of the product that was to be NetVault 6 was started by Fabrice Helliker and his team. It had some unique features, including common Graphical User Interface between Windows, UNIX and Linux; support for shared tape libraries on SANs; built-in VTL support; and a plug-in architecture for extending protection to applications and devices.
- 1998: NetVault K.K. in Japan was created by BakBone co-founders Tony Cerqueira and Pat Barcus. The Willow Ltd. was renamed to NetVault Ltd.
- 1999: The development of NetVault 6 core product was complete and was released at the end of the year.
- 2000: BakBone Software bought NetVault Ltd. through a reverse merger by BakBone co-founders Tony Cerqueira and Pat Barcus.
- 2000: BakBone Software introduced NetVault 6.03, which supported the Network Data Management Protocol (NDMP) on NetApp filers.
- 2003: BakBone Software released NetVault 7, which added user-level access and a reporting infrastructure.
- 2006: The core team that designed NetVault 6 left BakBone to form Cofio Software.
- 2009: BakBone Software acquired the continuous data protection (CDP) technology from Asempra Technologies. It was rebranded NetVault FastRecover.
- 2011: Quest Software completed the acquisition of BakBone Software and made the NetVault product line the core component of their data protection strategy.
- 2012: Dell completed its acquisition of Quest Software, and added it to the Dell Software Group. The NetVault product line was now a part of Dell Software's "Systems Management" strategic area.
- 2014: Dell releases NetVault Backup 10.0, with a Web-based user interface and a new back-end database.
- 2016: Dell sells the Dell Software Group to Francisco Partners and Elliott Management Corporation, and it is branded 'Quest', reusing the brand from which Dell acquired most of its software assets.

== See also ==
- List of backup software
