= Itai Yanai =

American-Israeli biomedical scientist

- Born: February 6, 1975 (age 51)
- Education: Boston University (B.S.), Boston University (Ph.D.)
- Occupations: Biomedical scientist, Professor, Founding Director
- Known for: Bioinformatics research, experimental cell biology research, "Night Science" concept, co-hosting "Night Science" podcast
- Scientific career
- Fields: Biomedical science, Bioinformatics, Cell biology
- Workplaces: NYU Grossman School of Medicine, Technion – Israel Institute of Technology, Weizmann Institute of Science, Harvard University

Itai Yanai (Hebrew: איתי ינאי; born 6 February 1975) is an American-Israeli biomedical scientist and Founding Director of the Institute for Computational Medicine at the NYU Grossman School of Medicine. He is also a professor in the Department of Biochemistry and Molecular Pharmacology at NYU.

== Early life and education ==
Yanai was born in Haifa, Israel, and moved with his family to Boston in his early teens, when his father Moshe Yanai was appointed Chief Engineer at EMC. He graduated from Boston University in 1998 with degrees in computer engineering and philosophy, both summa cum laude. In 2002 he became the first person in the nation to receive a Ph.D. in, what was at the time, the fledgling field of Bioinformatics. After several years at the Weizmann Institute and Harvard University, he returned to Israel in 2008 as a faculty member at the Technion-Israel Institute of Technology. He moved to the United States in 2016, when he assumed his current position.

== Research ==
Yanai has published extensively in bioinformatics and theory. He has also done seminal experimental research in cell biology.

In 2016 Yanai co-authored a popular book for the general public.

Together with Martin J. Lercher, Yanai has written a series of editorials on the creative side of the scientific process, which he called "Night Science" in reference to François Jacob. He also co-hosts a popular podcast with the same name.
