= Martin J. Lercher =

German computational biologist

Martin J. Lercher is a Professor of Computational Cell Biology at Heinrich Heine University Düsseldorf (HHU). His research focuses on developing computational methods to model single cells and complete plants, aiming to understand their organization and physiology based on physical and chemical constraints.

== Biography ==
Lercher studied physics at the University of Cologne and the Max Planck Institute for Neurological Research, receiving his Diplom in 1992. From 1992 to 1996, Lercher completed a PhD in theoretical physics at the University of Cambridge, focusing on high-temperature superconductivity. From 1996 to 1999, he worked in the private sector as a senior manager at Matratzen Concord AG.

In 2000, Lercher moved to the University of Bath as a Wellcome Trust Advanced Training Fellow and later a Royal Society University Research Fellow, after which he was a guest group leader and a DFG Heisenberg Fellow at the European Molecular Biology Laboratory in Heidelberg from 2004 to 2006. In 2005, he completed his habilitation in genetics at the University of Cologne with a thesis titled "The evolution of human genomic anatomy".

Lercher became a Professor of Bioinformatics and Computational Cell Biology at Heinrich Heine University Düsseldorf in 2007, a position he still holds.

== Research ==
Lercher's research group uses computational modeling to study the organization and evolution of complex cellular networks, with a focus on metabolism. They aim to uncover design principles shaped by natural selection. In their plant research, they develop multi-scale models integrating coarse-grained plant anatomy with detailed molecular models of photosynthesis to simulate mass and energy flow based on physical and chemical laws.

Lercher's works span the evolution of bacterial metabolic networks and of C4 carbon fixation in plants, the optimal organization of bacterial cells, and the evolution of gene order in the human genome. His recent work focuses on using AI models to predict interactions between proteins and small molecules.

In 2022, Lercher was awarded a European Research Council Advanced Grant for his project "Mechanistic Systems Biology modelling of plant environmental adaption and CAM photosynthesis engineering (MECHSYS)".

== Creativity in science ==
In addition to his primary research, Lercher developed the "Night Science" concept along with Itai Yanai, a professor at New York University. Night Science refers to the creative, exploratory side of the scientific process, in contrast to the rigorous, systematic "Day Science". Yanai and Lercher argue that this creative process is crucial for innovation but often hidden in traditional presentations of the scientific process.

Yanai and Lercher have published a series of editorials in the journal Genome Biology exploring aspects of Night Science, such as the role of serendipity in scientific discoveries, strategies for generating novel hypotheses, and the importance of interdisciplinary thinking. They also host a popular Night Science podcast where they discuss the creative side of science with diverse guests.
