= EMC Symmetrix =

Enterprise storage array

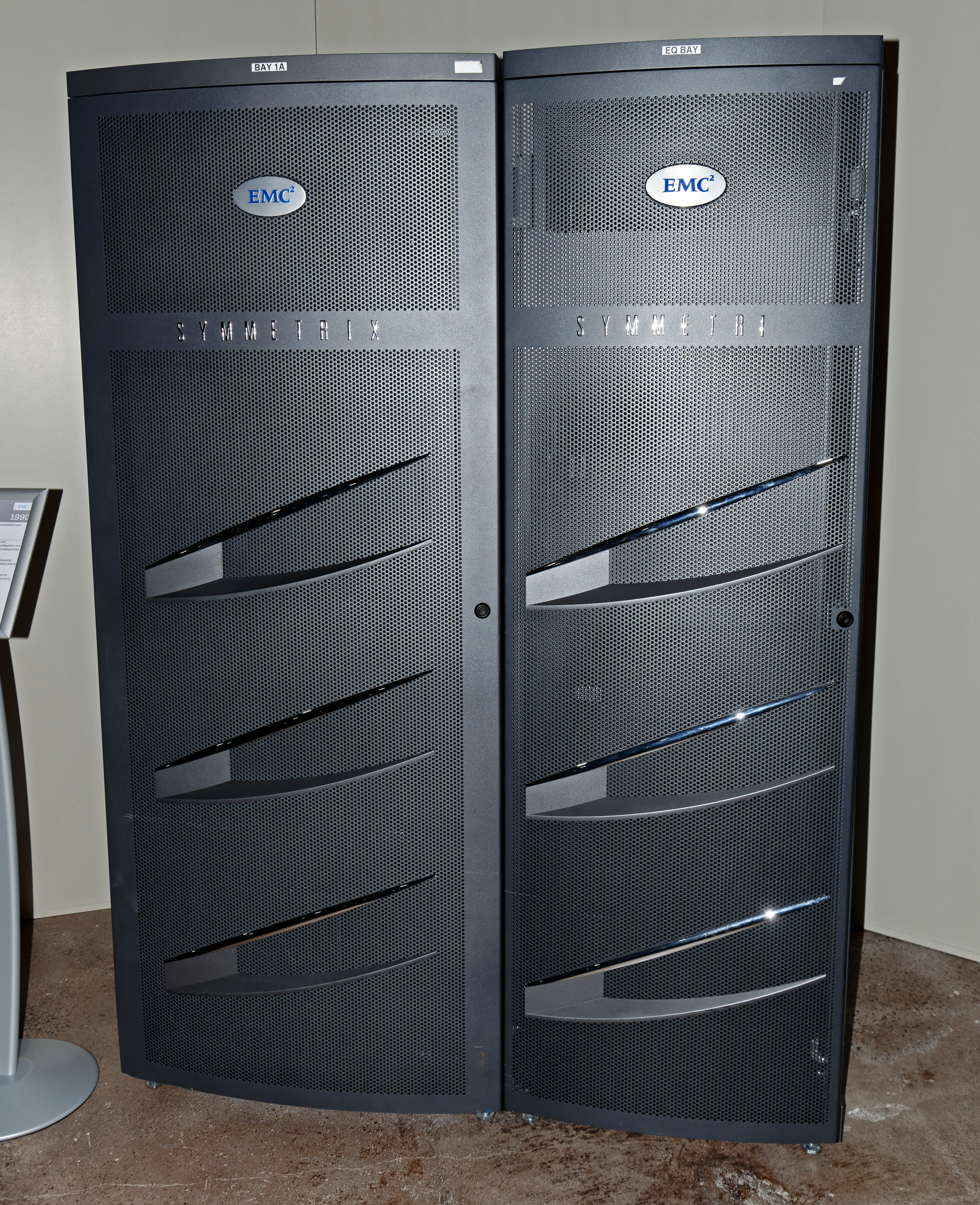
- Also known as: EMC Symmetrix DMX EMC Symmetrix VMAX
- Developer: EMC Corporation
- Type: Storage server
- Released: 1992; 34 years ago
- Discontinued: 2014
- Successor: Dell EMC VMAX

The Symmetrix system was an EMC enterprise storage array. It combined dozens of hard drives into a single virtual device that was then directly attached to a computer or I/O channel, or shared on a storage area network or a local area network. It was the flagship product of EMC in the 1990s and 2000s.

== History ==
Symmetrix arrays, EMC's flagship product at that time, began shipping in 1990 as a storage array connected to an IBM mainframe via the block multiplexer channel. Newer generations of Symmetrix brought additional host connection protocols which include ESCON, SCSI, Fibre Channel-based storage area networks (SANs), FICON and iSCSI. The Symmetrix product was initially popular within the airline industry and with companies that were willing to deviate from the safety of IBM's 3390 disk subsystem and take a risk with the unproven Symmetrix array.

This product is the main reason for the rapid growth of EMC in the 1990s, both in size and value, from a company valued hundreds of millions of dollars to a multi-billion company. Moshe Yanai managed the Symmetrix development from the product's inception in 1987 until shortly before leaving EMC in 2001, and his Symmetrix development team grew from several people to thousands.

=== Symmetrix VMAX ===
EMC Symmetrix VMAX systems are storage platforms intended for open systems and mainframe computing. Symmetrix VMAX systems run the Enginuity operating environment.

== Models ==
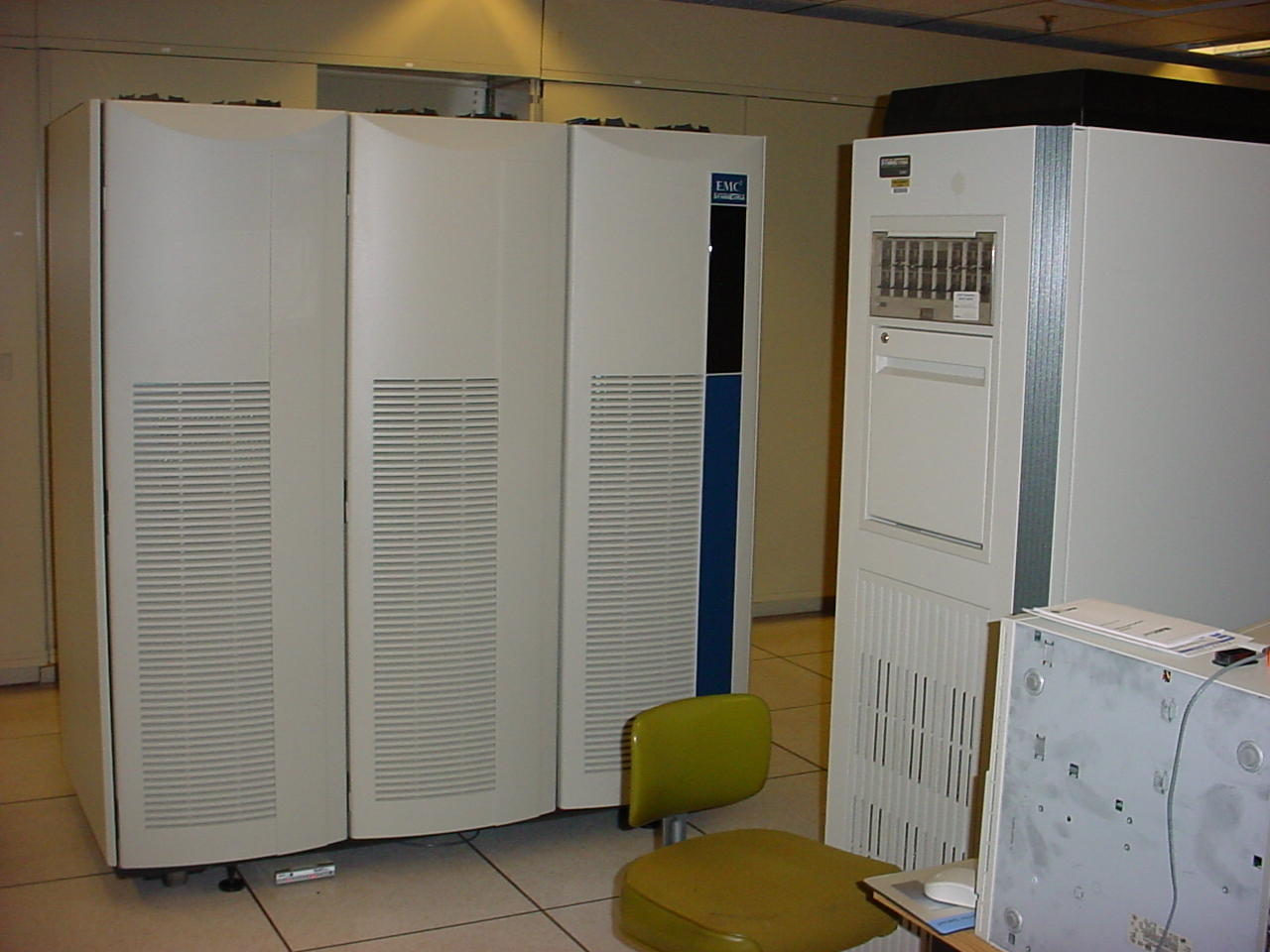
Symmetrix 4 racks

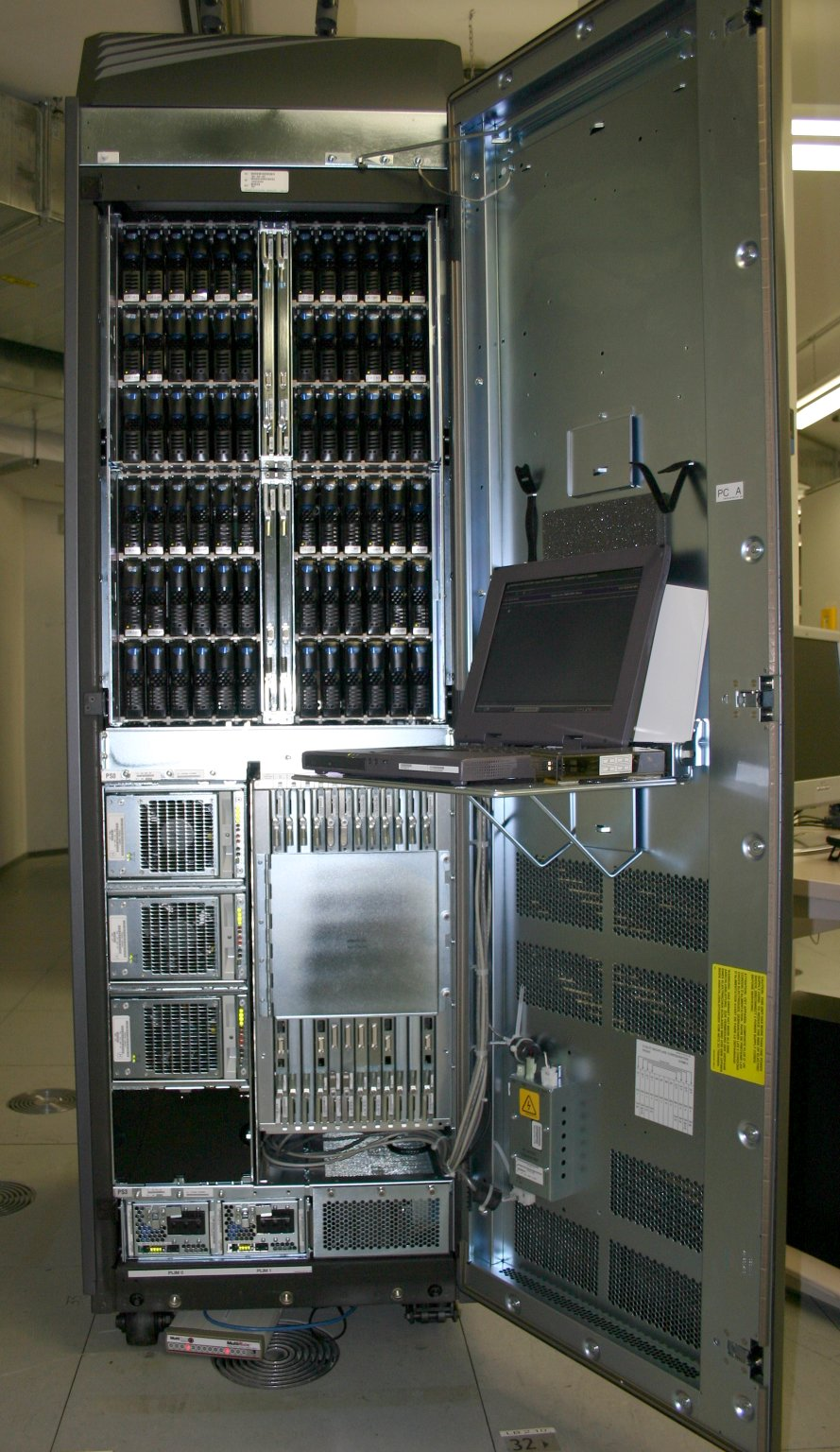
Symmetrix DMX1000

Generation	Models	Production years	Disks (Max)	Memory (Max)
EMC Symmetrix models
Symm2	4000, 4400, 4800	1992	24	
Symm3	3100, 3200, 3500	1994	32 / 96 / 128	4 GB
Symm 4.0	3330/5330, 3430/5430, 3700/5700	1996	32 / 96 / 128	8 GB / 16 GB
Symm 4.8	3630/5630, 3830/5830, 3930/5930	1998	32 / 96 / 256 / 384	8 GB / 16 GB
Symm 5.0	8430, 8730	2000	96 / 384	32 GB
Symm 5.5	8230, 8530, 8830	2001	48 / 96 / 384	32 GB
EMC Symmetrix DMX models
DMX, DMX2	DMX-800, DMX-1000, DMX-2000, DMX-3000	2003	144 / 288 / 576	
DMX3, DMX4	1500, 2500, 3500, 4500	2005	240 / 960 / 1440 / 2400	64 / 144 / 216 / 256 GB
EMC Symmetrix VMAX models
VMAX	VMAX, VMAXe, VMAX-SE, VMAX 10K, VMAX 20K, VMAX 40K	2009+	1080 / 2400 / 3200	512 / 1024 / 2048 GB
Dell EMC VMAX models
VMAX3	VMAX 100K, 200K, 400K	2014+	1440 / 2880 / 5760	2TB / 8TB / 16 TB
VMAX All Flash	VMAX 250F, 450F, 850F, 950F	2016+	1PB / 2PB / 4PB / 4PB	4TB / 8TB / 16TB / 16TB
Dell PowerMax NVMe models
PowerMax	PowerMax 2000, 8000	2018	1PB / 4PB	4TB / 16TB
PowerMax	PowerMax 2500, 8500	2022	8PB / 18PB	15TB / 45TB

The Direct Matrix Architecture (DMX) product line with models DMX800, DMX1000 and DMX2000 were announced in February 2003.

=== Specifications ===
The system scales from a single Symmetrix VMAX Engine system with one storage bay to a large eight-engine system with a maximum of ten storage bays.

The Symmetrix VMAX system bay can hold one to eight engines. These engines house the hardware for all the data processing capabilities. Each engine contains two director boards, memory chips, and front-end (FE) and back-end (BE) ports for connectivity to hosts and storage bays, respectively.

Each director board contains two Intel quad-core processors for data processing, 16, 32 or 64 GB of physical memory, one System Interface Board (SIB) that connects the director to the Matrix Interface Board Enclosure (MIBE), front-end and back-end ports.

The VMAX has one to ten storage bays for hard drives. Each storage bay contains 16 Disk Array Enclosures (DAE). Each DAE contains 15-25 hard drives. VMAX supports SATA, Fiber Channel, SAS and Solid State drives.

== Features ==
=== Symmetrix Remote Data Facility ===
The Symmetrix Remote Data Facility (SRDF) is a family of software products that facilitates the data replication from one Symmetrix storage array to another through a storage area network or Internet Protocol (IP) network.

SRDF logically pairs a device or a group of devices from each array and replicates data from one to the other synchronously or asynchronously. An established pair of devices can be split, so that separate hosts can access the same data independently (maybe for backup), and then be resynchronised.

In synchronous mode (SRDF/S), the primary array waits until the secondary array has acknowledged each write before the next write is accepted, ensuring that the replicated copy of the data is always as current as the primary. However, the latency due to propagation increases significantly with distance.

Asynchronous SRDF (SRDF/A) transfers changes made to the secondary array in units called delta sets, which are transferred at defined intervals. Although the remote copy of the data will never be as current as the primary copy, this method can replicate data over considerable distances and with reduced bandwidth requirements and minimal impact on host performance.

Other forms of SRDF integrate with clustered environments and to manage multiple SRDF pairs where replication of multiple devices must be consistent (such as with the data files and log files of a database application).

=== Other features ===
- TimeFinder, TimeFinder/Clone—Local Replication
- Symmetrix Optimizer—Dynamical swap disks based on workload
- Symmetrix command line interface (SymmCli)
- SymmWin, Enginuity—Symmetrix GUI console (since Symm3, Symm4 models)
- AnatMain—Symmetrix Pseudo-GUI console (before Symm3, Symm4 models)
- Symmetrix remote console (SymmRemote)
- SymmMerge and SymmTrAn—Symmetrix performance modeling and analysis applications
- FAST—Fully automated storage tiering
- FTS—Federated tiered storage
- ECC—EMC Control Center

== See also ==
- EMC Corporation
- Storage replication
- Storage area network (SAN)
