= Hitachi SH-G1000 =

The Hitachi SH-G1000 was one of the first and largest smartphones. New units were available for purchase for about a year, beginning in August 2003. The G1000 featured a full QWERTY keyboard and a large 250x360x65546 TFT display. It was a single-band phone, carried by Sprint for use on their PCS 1xRTT data network, running the Pocket PC 2002 operating system and software and came with a USB cradle to sync with a computer. Sprint discontinued selling this phone with the popularity increase of Windows Mobile 2003, which the G1000 was not upgradable to. It featured, on top of all the features of Pocket PC 2002, an improved Today screen (similar to the Windows Mobile 5 Today screen, the Clearvue office viewer to view your Microsoft Office documents like they would appear on a desktop PC, and the Hitachi Data Backup application.

== Features ==
- Rotating camera
- WAP viewer
- Large color screen
- MMC/SD expansion memory slot

== Specifications ==
- Processor: 400 MHz Intel Xscale
- Camera: 640x480
- Built-in memory: 32MB
- Network: Sprint PCS CDMA 1900 MHz
- Battery: Lithium-ion
- Dimensions: 147 mm x 84 mm x 23 mm (5.8" x 3.3" x 0.9")
- Weight: 238gm (8.4oz.)
- FCC ID: ALBSH-G1000
