= Dell EMC VMAX =

Storage array product

- Developer: Dell EMC
- Type: Storage server
- Released: 2014; 12 years ago
- CPU: x86 (Intel)
- Predecessor: EMC Symmetrix VMAX
- Related: EMC VNX
- Website: PowerMax

Dell EMC VMAX is Dell EMC’s flagship enterprise storage array product line. It evolved out of the EMC Symmetrix array, EMC’s primary storage product of 1990s and early 2000s.

== History ==
Symmetrix was EMC Corporation's flagship product from 1990, when it first shipped, until 2003 when the Direct Matrix Architecture (DMX) product line was introduced to replace it. The first Symmetrix systems were storage arrays connected to an IBM mainframe via the block multiplexer channel.

Newer generations of Symmetrix brought additional host connection protocols which include ESCON, SCSI, Fibre Channel-based storage area networks (SANs), FICON and iSCSI. The 1995 release of Symmetrix 3000 was recognized as the first open system to connect to mainframe-class storage over standard SCSI protocols. The Symmetrix product was initially popular within the airline industry and with companies that were willing to deviate from the safety of IBM's 3390 disk subsystem and take a risk with the unproven Symmetrix array.

This product is the main reason for the rapid growth of EMC in the 1990s, both in size and value, from a company valued hundreds of millions of dollars to a multi-billion company. Moshe Yanai managed the Symmetrix development from the product's inception in 1987 until shortly before leaving EMC in 2001, and his Symmetrix development team grew from several people to thousands.

The Direct Matrix Architecture (DMX) product line was announced in February 2003. This architecture replaced older switch- and bus-based architectures, offering significant performance improvements in the process. The Symmetrix DMX Architecture featured Channel Directors for host communication, Disk Directors for disk communication, and Global Memory Directors for I/O delivery from hosts to Disk Directors.

In 2009, EMC introduced the Virtual Matrix Architecture, which was a re-design of the DMX architecture to reflect the ongoing virtualization trend. The new architecture could support “hundreds of thousands of terabytes of storage and millions of IOPS (input/output per second) supporting hundreds of thousands of VMware and other virtual machines in a single federated storage infrastructure.” VMAX (then called EMC Symmetrix V-Max) was the first storage system to support this new scale out architecture offering from one engine to eight engines of expansion.

Since the introduction of VMAX, development has continued on both the hardware and software fronts, including the original Enginuity operating system, which was replaced by the HYPERMAX OS when the VMAX3 line was introduced in 2014 with a built-in storage hypervisor. All-Flash versions of the product line were introduced in 2016, further increasing system scalability, reliability and sub-millisecond latency. All-Flash systems accounted for 80% of all VMAX revenue as of May, 2017 according to IDC.

== Models ==
Generation	Models	Production years	Disks (Max)	Memory (Max)
EMC Symmetrix models
Symm2	4000, 4400, 4800	1992	24	
Symm3	3100, 3200, 3500	1994	32 / 96 / 128	4 GB
Symm 4.0	3330/5330, 3430/5430, 3700/5700	1996	32 / 96 / 128	8 GB / 16 GB
Symm 4.8	3630/5630, 3830/5830, 3930/5930	1998	32 / 96 / 256 / 384	8 GB / 16 GB
Symm 5.0	8430, 8730	2000	96 / 384	32 GB
Symm 5.5	8230, 8530, 8830	2001	48 / 96 / 384	32 GB
EMC Symmetrix DMX models
DMX, DMX2	DMX-800, DMX-1000, DMX-2000, DMX-3000	2003	144 / 288 / 576	
DMX3, DMX4	1500, 2500, 3500, 4500	2005	240 / 960 / 1440 / 2400	64 / 144 / 216 / 256 GB
EMC Symmetrix VMAX models
VMAX	VMAX, VMAXe, VMAX-SE, VMAX 10K, VMAX 20K, VMAX 40K	2009+	1080 / 2400 / 3200	512 / 1024 / 2048 GB
Dell EMC VMAX models
VMAX3	VMAX 100K, 200K, 400K	2014+	1440 / 2880 / 5760	2TB / 8TB / 16 TB
VMAX All Flash	VMAX 250F, 450F, 850F, 950F	2016+	1PB / 2PB / 4PB / 4PB	4TB / 8TB / 16TB / 16TB
Dell PowerMax NVMe models
PowerMax	PowerMax 2000, 8000	2018	1PB / 4PB	4TB / 16TB
PowerMax	PowerMax 2500, 8500	2022	8PB / 18PB	15TB / 45TB

== Technology and architecture ==
The core components of the Symmetrix Direct Matrix Architecture consisted of two back-end director boards, two memory boards, and two front-end boards. These components were integrated into the VMAX engine, which includes a pair of highly-available directors with dual Virtual Matrix Interconnects.

VMAX systems are high-end, scalable storage platforms intended for open systems and mainframe computing. The VMAX system features a bay containing one to eight engines and separate rollup storage bays. The system grows by aggregating up to eight Symmetrix VMAX engines in a single system with fully shared connectivity, processing, memory and storage capacity resources.

Each director board contains two Intel quad-core processors for data processing, 16, 32 or 64 GB of physical memory, one System Interface Board (SIB) that connects the director to the Matrix Interface Board Enclosure (MIBE), front-end and back-end ports. Each VMAX system supports up to 10 storage bays for hard drives. Each storage bay contains 16 Disk Array Enclosures (DAE), and each enclosure contains 15-25 hard drives. VMAX supports SATA, Fiber Channel, SAS and Solid State drives.

The VMAX All Flash system is made up of V-Bricks (engine and two DAEs) and uses the embedded operating environment called HYPERMAX OS, InfiniBand for interconnect technology, inline compression, ProtectPoint for direct backup of volumes to Data Domain, open, IBM mainframe and IBM i host support, and file access support with embedded NAS data services based on VNX NAS.

The Symmetrix Remote Data Facility (SRDF) facilitates data replication between VMAX arrays through a storage area network (SAN) or Internet Protocol (IP) network. SRDF logically pairs a device or a group of devices from each array and replicates data from one to the other synchronously or asynchronously. An established pair of devices can be split, so that separate hosts can access the same data independently (maybe for backup), and then be resynchronized. SRDF/Metro was introduced in 2016 to provide active / active data center replication across metro distances of 100KM. A later HYPERMAX OS refresh added SRDF/Metro with virtual witness and asynchronous third-site disaster recovery protection.
