= Virtual Storage Platform =

Computer data storage systems

Virtual Storage Platform (VSP) is the brand name for a Hitachi Data Systems (now Hitachi Vantara) line of computer data storage systems for data centers. This line consists of mid-range and high-end enterprise models with differing capabilities. Currently supported models include: G350, G370, E590, G700, E790, G900 and E1090 for mid-range systems; G1000, G1500 and 5000-series for high-end enterprise systems.

== History ==
Hitachi Virtual Storage Platform, also known as VSP, was first introduced in September, 2010. This storage platform builds on the design of Universal Storage Platform V, originally released in 2007.

== Architecture ==
At the heart of the system is the HiStar E-Network, a network crossbar switch matrix. This storage platform is made up of different technologies than USP and USP V. The connectivity to back-end disks is via 6 Gbit/s SAS links instead of 4 Gbit/s Fibre Channel loop. The internal processors are now Intel multi-core processors, and in addition to 3.5-inch drives support has been added for 2.5 inch small-form factor HDDs. The VSP supports SSD, SAS and SATA drives.

Features included:

- The ability for growth in three ways:
  - Scale up to meet increasing demands by dynamically adding processors, connectivity and capacity in a single unit. This enables tuning the configuration for optimal performance for both open systems and mainframe environments.
  - Scale out to meet demands by dynamically combining multiple units into a single logical system with shared resources. Support increased needs in virtualized server environments and ensure safe multitenancy and quality of service through partitioning of cache and ports.
  - Scale deep to extend the functions of Hitachi Virtual Storage Platform to multivendor storage through virtualization. Offload less-critical data to external tiers in order to optimize the availability of the tier one resources.
- Supports automated storage tiering, known as Dynamic Tiering, to automate the movement of data between tiers to optimize performance.
- Front to back cooling airflow for more efficient cooling
- Improved capacity per square foot and lower power consumption compared to the USP V.
- Enables virtualization of external SAN storage from Hitachi and other vendors into one pool
- Supports online local and distance replication and migration of data nondisruptively internally and between heterogeneous storage, without interrupting application I/O through use of products such as Tiered Storage Manager, ShadowImage, TrueCopy and Universal Replicator.
- Single image global cache accessible across all virtual storage directors for maximum performance.
- Automated wide-striping of data, which allows pool balancing and lets volume grow or shrink dynamically.
- The system can scale between one and six 19-inch rack cabinets. It can hold a maximum of 2,048 SAS high-density 2.5-inch drives for 1.2 petabytes of capacity, or 1,280 3.5-inch SATA drives for a maximum capacity of 2.5 petabytes.
- Supports thin provisioning and storage reclamation on internal and external virtual storage
- Provides encryption, WORM and data shredding services, data resilience and business continuity services and content management services.

== Specifications ==
Virtual Storage Platform specifications in 2010 were:

- Frames (19-inch racks) - Integrated Control Chassis/Disk Chassis Frame (2) and up to 4 optional Disk Chassis Frames
- HiStar-E Network - Number of grid switches 4 pair (8)
- Aggregate bandwidth (GB/sec) - 192
- Aggregate IOPS - 5,600,000
- Cache Memory
  - Number of data cache adapters (DCA) 2-16
  - Module capacity 2-8 GB
  - Maximum cache memory 1,024 GB
- Control Memory
  - Number of control memory modules 2-8
  - Module capacity 2-4 GB
  - Maximum control memory 32 GB
- Front End Directors (Connectivity)
  - Number of Directors 2-24
  - Fibre Channel host ports per Director - 8 or 16
  - Fibre Channel port performance - 2, 4, 8 Gbit/s
  - Maximum Fibre Channel host ports - 192
  - Virtual host ports - 1,024 per physical port
  - Maximum IBM FICON host ports - 192
  - Maximum IBM FCoE host ports - 96
- Logical Devices (LUNs) — Maximum Supported
  - Open systems 65,536
  - IBM z/OS 65,536
- Disks
  - Type: Flash 200 GB (2.5"), 400 GB (3.5")
  - Type: SAS 146, 300, 600 GB (2.5")
  - Type: SATA II 2 TB
  - Number of disks per system (max) 2.5" - 2,048; 3.5" - 1,280
  - Number spare disks per system (min-max) 1-256
  - Maximum Internal Raw Capacity - (2 TB disks) 2.52PB
  - RAID 1, 5, 6 support
  - Maximum internal and external capacity 255PB
  - Max. Usable Internal capacity RAID-5 (7D+1P)
    - OPEN-V 2,080.8 TB
    - z/OS 3390M 2,192.2 TB
  - Max. Usable Internal Capacity RAID-6 (6D+2P)
    - OPEN-V 1,879 TB
    - z/OS 3390M 1,779.7 TB
  - Max. Usable Internal Capacity RAID-1+0 (2D+2D)
    - OPEN-V 1,256.6 TB
    - z/OS 3390M 1,190.2 TB
- Virtual Storage Machines 32 max
- Back End Directors 2-8
- Operating System Support
  - Mainframe
    - IBM: z/OS, z/OS.e, OS/390, z/VM, VM/ESA, zVSE, VSE/ESA, MVS/XA, MVS/ESA, TPF, Linux for IBM S/390 and zSeries;
  - Open systems
    - HP: HP-UX, Tru64 UNIX, Open VMS
    - IBM: AIX
    - Microsoft: Windows Server 2000, 2003, 2008
    - Novell: NetWare, SUSE Linux
    - Red Hat: Enterprise Linux
    - Oracle: Solaris
    - VMware: ESX Server

== Storage Management ==
Hitachi Command Suite (formerly Hitachi Storage Command Suite) provides integrated storage resource management, tiered storage and business continuity software. Hitachi Command Suite employs a use case-driven, step-by-step wizard-based approach that allows administrators to perform tasks such as new volume provisioning, configuration of external storage, and creation/expansion of storage pools easily on the fly.

Hitachi Command Suite is composed of the following software products:

- Hitachi Basic Operating System
  - Hitachi Dynamic Provisioning
  - Hitachi Device Manager
  - Hitachi Dynamic Link Manager Advanced
- Hitachi Basic Operating System V
  - Hitachi Universal Volume Manager
- Hitachi Dynamic Tiering
- Hitachi Command Director
- Hitachi Storage Capacity Reporter, powered by APTARE
- Hitachi Tiered Storage Manager
- Hitachi Tuning Manager
- Hitachi Virtual Server Reporter, powered by APTARE

Hitachi Command Suite also supports management interfaces such as SNMP and SMI-S.

== See also ==
- HPE XP
