= Cofio Software =

American software company

Cofio Software Incorporated
- Industry: Computer software
- Founded: 2006; 20 years ago
- Headquarters: San Diego, California, United States
- Key people: Tony Cerqueira, (CEO), Fabrice Helliker (CTO) Patrick Barcus, (Director)
- Products: AIMstor
- Parent: Hitachi Data Systems
- Website: www.cofio.com

Cofio Software, headquartered in San Diego, California, was a privately held software company founded in 2006 which produced a product called AIMstor. After being acquired in 2012 the product became known as the Hitachi Data Instance Director. and later became Hitachi Ops Center Protector

== History ==
The Cofio founders were also founders of BakBone Software, with the majority of the Cofio's engineering team also being the core developers at BakBone. They were the team that created the re-designed NetVault Backup 6 product. The engineering team was based in the South of England and worked together since the early 1990s. The company name Cofio is a Welsh language term meaning "to remember".

The company developed data management storage management software. The product was branded and given the trademark AIMstor in 2008.

Cofio was acquired by Hitachi Data Systems (HDS) on September 21, 2012, and the AIMstor product was released as Hitachi Data Instance Director (HDID). HDID orchestrates data protection technologies on HDS storage arrays. HDID workflow and policy management capabilities are being utilized for end-to-end data management.

== Products ==
=== AIMstor ===
The concept of AIMstor was the prevailing reason Cofio Software was founded. The intention of the product was to provide data management functions such as backup, archiving, real-time replication, full recovery and continuous data protection (True-CDP) under one platform. Rather than having many different products that are later integrated in a complex fashion, AIMstor was a workflow manager for other data protection and data management products. At the core of Cofio's attempt at providing consolidated features was a user interface that allows data policies and data movement to be defined graphically allowing complex topologies to be created quickly, and to help administrators see the workflow of the policy and the data.

Another cited major component of AIMstor was the Repository. This aimed to provide a storage platform that could ingest live data to provide backup, continuous data protection and data archiving. It performed data deduplication as well as possessing an indexing engine allowing for fast search of the repository content.

Although AIMstor was a single product it was marketed as separate products such as AIMstor Backup, AIMstor Replication, AIMstor CDP, etc.

AIMstor supported Microsoft Windows and Linux.

=== ViStor ===
ViStor is a software implementation of a virtual tape library (VTL). It was released in 2007 to OEMs in Asia specifically who create VTL appliances using the ViStor software. The software runs on a version of Linux and supports the iSCSI protocol as well as Emulex Fibre Channel host bus adapters. The product was no longer supported after the HDS acquisition.
