= Infinidat =

Israeli-American data storage company

- Type: Private
- Industry: Data storage
- Founded: 2011
- Founder: Moshe Yanai
- Headquarters: Waltham, MA; Herzliya, Israel
- Area served: Worldwide
- Key people: Phil Bullinger (CEO); Steve Sullivan(CRO); Shahar Bar-Or(CPO); Eric Herzog(CMO)
- Parent: Lenovo
- Website: infinidat.com

Infinidat is an Israeli-American enterprise data storage company. The company has offices in 17 countries and two headquarters: one in Waltham, MA and one in Herzliya, Israel.

Infinidat's products are used by large corporations and clients, including cloud service providers, telecoms, financial services firms, healthcare providers, and others that require large amounts of data storage.

== History ==
Infinidat was founded by Moshe Yanai in 2011. By 2015 it was valued at $1.2 billion, and in 2017 it was valued at $1.6 billion.

Yanai left the company in 2020, and Phil Bullinger, a former Western Digital executive, was named CEO in 2021.

On January 16, 2025, Lenovo announced plans to acquire Infinidat for an undisclosed amount.It was completed on April 9, 2026.

=== Funding ===
In 2015 the company received $150 million in funding during its Series B round led by TPG Growth.

In 2017, the company received $95 million in funding, in a Series C round led by Goldman Sachs. As of 2020, it has received a total of $370 million in funding.

== Products and services ==
In 2013 the company filed for thirty-nine patents, and later that year released its flagship product, the InfiniBox, which uses a triple-controller, memory-cached architecture. Each system initially managed about five petabytes of data. The InfiniBox hybrid array is also used as a backup target. InfiniBox’s hybrid array was updated in 2025, allowing it to hold 33PB in a single 42U rack. As of 2025, the InfiniBox G4 arrays use eight enclosures of 78 24TB drives.

Infinidat’s portfolio also includes InfiniBox SSA, an all-flash storage solution, and InfiniGuard, a purpose-built backup appliance. The company also offers InfiniSafe, data protection software that includes automated cyber resiliency and recovery systems.

InfiniBox’s storage software is the InfuzeOS operating system. Infinidat systems use a deep learning neural cache for read efficiency.

In 2024, Infinidat developed a new retrieval-augmented generation system aimed at optimizing data on enterprise storage systems for output to AI models.

== Awards ==
2025 - Gartner Peer Insights Customer Choice Award
