= Amdahl =

Amdahl may refer to:

== People ==
- Einar Amdahl (1888–1974), Norwegian theologist
- Bjarne Amdahl (1903–1968), Norwegian pianist and composer
- Douglas K. Amdahl (1919–2010), American lawyer and judge from Minnesota
- Gene Amdahl (1922–2015), formulator of Amdahl's law of parallel computing and founder of Amdahl Corporation

== Companies ==
- Amdahl Corporation, American manufacturer of IBM-compatible mainframe computers
