= Samsung SPH-G1000 =

Gaming cell phone

- Manufacturer: Samsung
- Type: Gaming phone
- First released: April 9th, 2005
- Availability by region: South Korea
- Compatible networks: CDMA 2000 1X
- Form factor: Slider
- Dimensions: 113×55×24 mm (4.45×2.17×0.94 in)
- Weight: 148 g (5 oz)
- Rear camera: 1.3 megapixel
- Display: 2.2 inches 240x320 pixels (QVGA); TFT-LCD; 262k colors
- Connectivity: USB
- Development status: Discontinued
- Other: WAP, Games, MP3-player, Java

Samsung SPH-G1000 is a gaming phone introduced by Samsung in March 2005 at the CTIA show. It features a 2.2-inch TFT-LCD, a 1.3-megapixel camera and a 3D acceleration chip for 3D-gaming capabilities. It was primarily designed for video games playing. It was released in South Korea in April 2005.

== See also ==
- N-Gage
- N-Gage QD
- Xperia Play
