= Luminex Corporation =

American biotechnology company

- Type: Subsidiary
- Traded as: Nasdaq: LMNX
- Industry: Biotechnology
- Founded: 1995; 31 years ago
- Headquarters: Austin, Texas, United States
- Products: xMAP, xTAG, MAGPIX, Luminex 100/200, FLEXMAP 3D, NxTAG, ARIES, VERIGENE, Amnis Cellstream, Amnis FlowSight, Amnis ImageStreamX Mk II, Guava Muse, Guava easyCyte
- Number of employees: 1,080 (2023)
- Parent: DiaSorin
- Website: www.luminexcorp.com

Luminex Corporation is a biotechnology company which develops, manufactures and markets proprietary biological testing technologies with applications in life-sciences.

== Background ==
Luminex's Multi-Analyte Profiling (xMAP) technology allows simultaneous analysis of up to 500 bioassays from a small sample volume, typically a single drop of fluid, by reading biological tests on the surface of microscopic polystyrene beads called microspheres.

The xMAP technology combines this miniaturized liquid array bioassay capability with small lasers, light emitting diodes (LEDs), digital signal processors, photo detectors, charge-coupled device imaging and proprietary software to create a system offering advantages in speed, precision, flexibility and cost. The technology is currently being used within various segments of the life sciences industry, which includes the fields of drug discovery and development, and for clinical diagnostics, genetic analysis, bio-defense, food safety and biomedical research.

The Luminex MultiCode technology is used for real-time polymerase chain reaction (PCR) and multiplexed PCR assays. Luminex Corporation owns 315 issued patents worldwide, including over 124 issued patents in the United States based on its multiplexing xMAP platform.

In 2021, Luminex was acquired by DiaSorin, an Italian diagnostics firm, for $1.8 billion.
