= Moshe Yanai =

Israeli electrical engineer (born 1949)

- משה ינאי
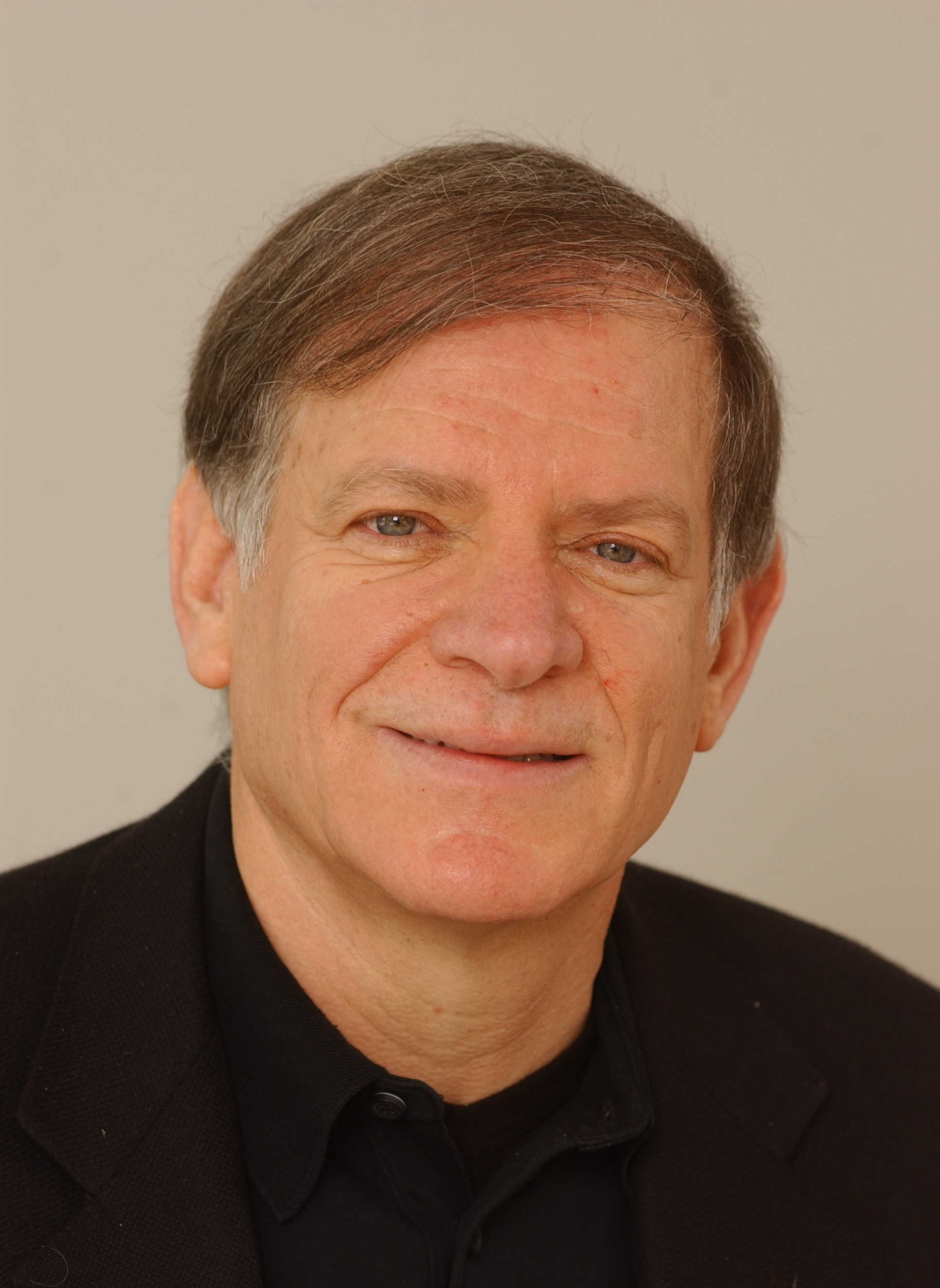
- Born: 1949 (age 76–77); Israel
- Education: B.Sc. in Electrical Engineering from Technion - Israel Institute of Technology
- Occupations: Electrical Engineer, inventor, businessman, entrepreneur, aviator, investor, philanthropist
- Known for: Leading the development of EMC Symmetrix

Moshe Yanai (Hebrew: משה ינאי; born 1949) is an Israeli electrical engineer. He is an inventor, businessman, entrepreneur, aviator, investor, and philanthropist. He led the development of the EMC Symmetrix, the flagship product of EMC Corporation in the 1990s, which prevented, to some extent, financial chaos in New York Stock Exchange and certain banks after the September 11 attacks.

== Biography ==
Moshe Yanai was born in 1949 in Israel, and earned a B.Sc. in electrical engineering in 1975 from Technion - Israel Institute of Technology.

== Elbit-Nixdorf project ==
Yanai began his career building IBM-compatible mainframe data storage based on minicomputer disks for Elbit Systems (a joint project with Nixdorf Computer). He went on to develop high-end storage systems for Nixdorf in the United States.

== EMC Corporation ==
Yanai joined EMC Corporation in 1987, and managed the Symmetrix development, software and hardware, from its inception in the late 1980s until shortly before leaving EMC in 2001. His development team grew from several people, recruited among his former Israeli colleagues, to thousands, while he was vice president. As a result, EMC grew in the 1990s, both in size and value, from a company with a fading business of (minicomputer) computer memory boards, valued in several millions of dollars, to a hundreds-of-billions company. Before leaving Yanai became an EMC Fellow.

Yanai led the development of the EMC Symmetrix, the flagship product of EMC Corporation in the 1990s, which was a first scalable network storage system in the market. EMC Symmetrix hardware and its SRDF (Symmetrix remote data facility) software placed EMC Corporation as "the most dominnat force in all of the storage industry". The Symmetrix network storage scalability made it the father of current cloud storage, essential in mamy avenues of online and big data technologies. The role of Yanai's contribution was described by 2001 ESG report by : ”the person most responsible for architecting the single most successful product in subsystem history (Symmetrix) has been Moshe Yanai".

Enterprises such as banks who depend on performance and big data found Symmetrix to be essential for their work. Later on, Symmetrix remote replication feature prevented financial chaos in New York Stock Exchange and certain banks after the September 11 attacks, as described by Barron's who called the SRDF “the true hero of 9/11”. This appreciation of Symmetrix and SDRF is based on the fact that "EMC has 25 customers in the World Trade Center... with another dozen in the immediate vicinity". The New York Stock Exchange and several important banks were among these 25 customers.

== Diligent Technologies and XIV ==
Yanai co-founded Diligent Technologies in Israel as an R&D center for EMC. Yanai also funded and led an Israeli storage startup company, XIV, which was bought by IBM in January 2008. IBM paid an estimated $300 million for a company invested in with an estimated $3 million. Shortly later, in April 2008, IBM also bought Diligent Technologies. Yanai continued leading XIV and became an IBM Fellow, while IBM XIV Storage System became an IBM storage product. Yanai left IBM in 2010.

== INFINIDAT ==
In 2011, Yanai founded Infinidat, a computer data storage company. In 2011, Infinidat announced Moshe became its CEO. In April 2015, Infinidat announced a $150 million investment led by TPG Capital. This investment placed it among the most valuable privately held companies. He also has been a board of directors member of several companies.

== Patents ==
Yanai is an inventor or co-inventor of about 40 US patents in the field of electronic data storage. For example only, two patents granted to EMC and invented by Yanai etal are:

1. US 5,390,313 granted February 14, 1995, titled "Data storage with data mirroring and reduced access time data retrieval".
2. US 5,544,347 granted August 6, 1996, titled " Data storage controlled remote data mirroring with respectively maintained data indices".

== Awards and recognition ==
- EMC Fellow – 2001
- IBM Fellow – 2008.
- IEEE Reynold B. Johnson Information Storage Systems Award – 2010, awarded "for sustained innovation and legendary leadership in development of clustered global cache storage architectures and business continuity solutions that have defined the enterprise storage industry".
- Distinguished Fellow of the Faculty of Electrical Engineering, Technion - Israel Institute of Technology – 2011. The Technion is Yanai's Alma mater.
- Honorary Doctorate, Technion - Israel Institute of Technology – 2012
