= Hitachi Data Systems =

Data storage provider

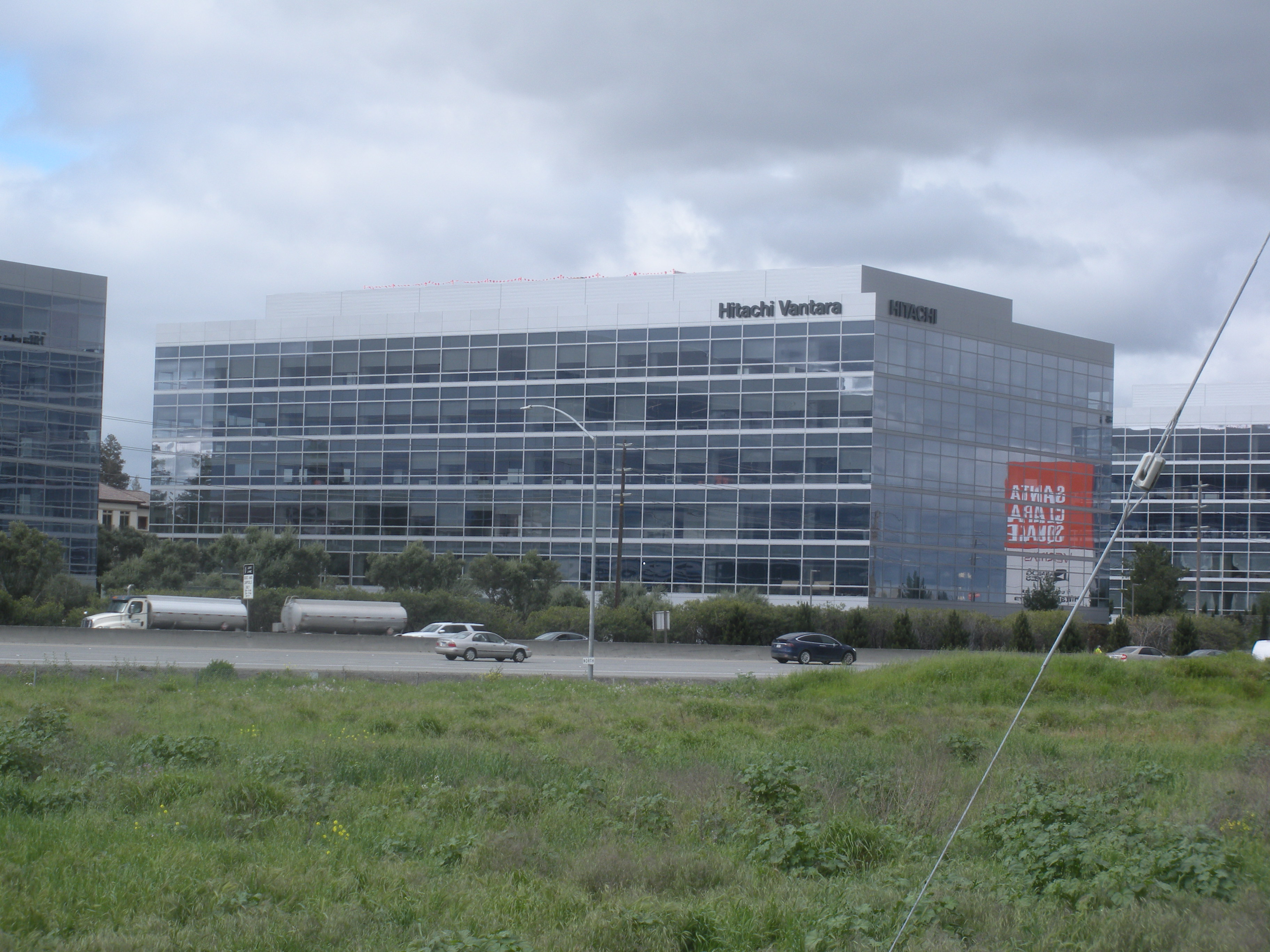
- Hitachi Vantara headquarters in April 2019
- Type: Subsidiary
- Industry: Computer data storage systems Data storage software Computer systems Computer hardware Computer software IT consulting IT services
- Founded: 1989; 37 years ago
- Successor: Hitachi Vantara
- Headquarters: Santa Clara, California, U.S.
- Key people: Gajen Kandiah (CEO)
- Number of employees: 6,300 employees in more than 100 countries and regions
- Parent: Hitachi
- Website: www.hitachivantara.com

Hitachi Data Systems (HDS) was a provider of modular mid-range and high-end computer data storage systems, software, and services. Its operations are now a part of Hitachi Vantara.

In 2010, Hitachi Data Systems sold through direct and indirect channels in more than 170 countries and regions, with customers that included over half of the Fortune 100 companies at the time.

It was a subsidiary of Hitachi and part of the Hitachi Information Systems & Telecommunications Division until 2017. In 2017, it merged with Pentaho and Hitachi Insight Group to form Hitachi Vantara.

== History ==
=== Origin as Itel ===
Itel was founded in 1967 by Peter Redfield and Gary Friedman as an equipment leasing company and initially focused on leasing IBM mainframes. Through creative financial arrangements and investments, Itel began to lease IBM mainframes to customers at lower costs, which led to Itel ranking second to IBM in revenues.

In 1977, a joint venture between National Semiconductor and Hitachi formed, and was contracted by Itel to manufacture IBM-compatible mainframes branded as Advanced Systems. After initial success shipping 200 such systems and net profits of $73 million, Itel increased investments and personnel to market its Advanced Systems brand. When Itel requested lower prices to compete with IBM, the CEO of National Semiconductor Charlie Sporck, persuaded Itel to commit to long-term contracts with National Semiconductor and Hitachi.

=== National Semiconductor takes over Advanced Systems ===
When news leaked that IBM was releasing a superior line of computers, customers held back purchases of Itel goods, causing Itel's inventory to build up drastically. Hitachi agreed to Itel's request to cut back on shipment, but National Semiconductor insisted that National had blackmailed Itel. In 1979, Redfield was forced to resign as CEO. National Semiconductor took over Itel Advanced Systems' sales and marketing divisions.

National Semiconductor renamed the National Advanced Systems (NAS) division, assembling and selling IBM-compatibles where the central processing unit (CPU) was imported from Hitachi. National and Hitachi relied upon IBM's gradual and restrained roll-out of newer models to support IBM's technology and market share, which supported NAS's occasional successes.

NAS began shipping its AS/9000 DPC plug compatible mainframes in late 1981. IBM, however, had invested and obtained success in semiconductor technologies which enabled them to build powerful computers at lower costs. Meanwhile, the mainframe market was in decline as mini and microcomputers, and the Unix operating system gained popularity. Mainframe makers such as Sperry, Honeywell, Burroughs, NCR and Control Data were gradually being forced out of the mainframe market. Both NAS and Amdahl (the other IBM plug-compatible mainframe maker), faced technological and sales pressure from IBM.

National Semiconductor and its subsidiary NAS were sued in 1983 by IBM for $2.5 billion on charges of using computer technology secrets stolen from IBM, as the result of an investigation by the United States Government into National's collaboration with Hitachi. Hitachi settled with IBM and licensed the mainframe operating system software from IBM. In 1983, NAS ceased manufacturing its line of mainframes (which had Hitachi processors) and became a reseller of Hitachi's mainframe and data storage products.

=== HDS (1989) ===
Hitachi Data Systems (HDS) was founded in 1989 when Hitachi and Electronic Data Systems (EDS) acquired National Advanced Systems (NAS) from National Semiconductor and renamed it Hitachi Data Systems. Before that, the origins of the company had a history that stretched back to Itel, an early player in the mainframe market. Intel's Computer Products Group sold National Semiconductors' IBM plug compatible mainframes. In 1979 National Semiconductor took over Itel and formed National Advanced Systems (NAS). NAS shifted from manufacturing mainframes and began marketing systems from Hitachi. In 1999, Hitachi bought out EDS's share, and HDS became a wholly owned subsidiary of Hitachi. For many years, HDS sold Hitachi IBM plug-compatible mainframes and storage systems, but in 2000, it exited the mainframe business and shifted its focus to enterprise storage.

=== Joint venture of Hitachi and EDS ===
On February 28, 1989, National Semiconductor and Hitachi announced their agreement that Hitachi and Electronic Data Systems (EDS) would jointly acquire NAS for $398 million in cash, of which Hitachi would own 80%. Memorex Telex and National had earlier, on January 10, 1989, announced plans on a joint venture "under which each company would own half of the unit and National would get $250 million plus four million shares of Memorex Telex". However, National proceeded to negotiate with Hitachi after Memorex's offer expired as National had felt that the Hitachi–EDS offer was a better deal as it entailed no further financial obligation or commitment on the part of National after the sale besides reaping a pre-tax profit of $200 million from the sale. By that time, Memorex Telex was able to arrange financing for the deal, but National had already accepted the Hitachi–EDS deal.

The acquisition was envisaged to provide Hitachi with a better presence in the United States to compete with IBM. The entity was renamed Hitachi Data Systems (HDS).

=== EDS stake ===
On January 29, 1999, Hitachi announced it would take over EDS' stake in HDS, appointing Jun Naruse as CEO of its new subsidiary. Naruse was an engineer with the RAID Systems Division who was involved in developing storage systems. Having total control of the company, Hitachi infused Hitachi Data Systems with its corporate culture, ethics, and practices.

=== Storage ===
On April 6, 2000, Hitachi Data Systems announced a re-organization to focus on storage systems rather than mainframes. Shortly thereafter (June 26, 2000), the first HDS storage product was unveiled, the Freedom Storage Lightning 9900, featuring the crossbar switched architecture to interconnect memory, disks, servers, and other external devices instead of the traditional bus architecture. In addition to HDS sales, HP OEM’d and Sun resold the 9900 and succeeding generations, which had additional capabilities such as virtualization of external Hitachi and third-party storage systems to form storage pools.

In January 2001, HDS announced the Thunder 9200, a mid-range modular storage system aimed at the small and medium business market, sold mainly through resellers.

Hitachi Data Systems high-end and mid-range modular storage systems were complemented by software for storage management, content management, business continuity, replication, data protection, and IT operations.

In 2002, Hitachi acquired Comstock Systems Corp, and analysts estimated that the acquisition would lead to a 35% percent market share.

=== Cloud computing ===
HDS moved to use the term cloud computing, culminating with an announcement on October 25, 2011. In August 2014, in partnership with Avnet, HDS announced cloud partners.

=== Acquisitions ===
- On February 6, 2007, Hitachi Data Systems acquired Archivas, a provider of digital archiving and content management products.
- On August 20, 2010, Hitachi Data Systems acquired the intellectual property and core engineering team of ParaScale, developer of storage software which uses a clustered file system on multiple Linux servers to present a single file-storage appliance.
- On September 7, 2011, Hitachi Data Systems acquired BlueArc which developed a clustered network attached storage product. It was estimated HDS had been responsible for about half of BlueArc's sales in 2010.
- On February 13, 2012, Hitachi Data Systems acquired Shoden Data Systems, a provider of data center technology in South Africa and across the sub-Saharan African continent.
- On September 26, 2012, Hitachi Data Systems acquired Cofio Software a provider of unified data protection and orchestration workflow software in San Diego, with engineering in Broadstone, England.
- On August 10, 2014, Hitachi Data Systems acquired Sepaton, a provider of computer appliances using data deduplication.
- On May 31, 2015, Hitachi Data Systems acquired oXya, a provider of services for SAP HANA from SAP.
- On June 4, 2015, Hitachi Data Systems completed the acquisition of Pentaho, marketing big data and data analytics. Pentaho is part of a company-wide movement of HDS towards Social Innovation using emerging technologies, including the Internet of things.
- On September 17, 2019, it was announced that Hitachi will integrate Hitachi Vantara and Hitachi Consulting to accelerate the global expansion of Hitachi's Social Innovation Business and Digital Growth. In January 2020, the integrated companies began operating under the brand Hitachi Vantara and were led by Toshiaki Tokunaga. Though not technically an acquisition, Hitachi Vantara absorbed Hitachi Consulting.
- In June 2026, it sold Pentaho to LEO Software Group.

== Corporate affairs ==
The corporate headquarters are in Santa Clara, California, with business offices in the United States, Australia and New Zealand, Canada, Latin America, Europe, the Middle East, and Africa.

=== Corporate culture, social responsibility, and work environment ===
The culture of Hitachi Vantara is influenced by the values of Hitachi: wa (harmony, trust, and respect), Makoto (integrity, honesty), and kaitakusha-seishin (pioneering spirit and challenges).

Hitachi Data Systems appeared in Fortune magazine's "100 Best Companies to Work For" list in 2012, 2013 and 2014 and was ranked No. 8 in the Fortune list of top-paying companies in 2012. Chief Executive Magazine gave HDS a ranking of No. 16 in its "40 Best Companies for Leaders" list for 2012. Hitachi Data Systems was recognized among the "Best Companies to Work For" in France and Poland in 2011. In 2010 Hitachi Data Systems was accredited by the Best Companies organization in the United Kingdom.

== Products and services ==
=== Hardware ===
- Virtual Storage Platform. High-end storage platform focused on consolidation for enterprise storage and IBM mainframe needs, including virtualization of internal and external heterogeneous storage into one pool and managing all data types.
- Hitachi Unified Storage VM. A unified system with enterprise storage virtualization for small and medium companies that can centrally consolidate and manage file, block, and object data.
- Hitachi Unified Storage 100 Family. Modular storage which enables central consolidation of file, block, and object data with up to 3PB capacity.
- Hitachi NAS Platform, by BlueArc. The Hitachi NAS Platform provides integrated network attached storage (NAS) for file sharing and file server consolidation with models for large enterprises and medium companies.
- Hitachi Content Platform (HCP). A distributed object storage system, available as a preconfigured hardware appliance or as a virtual software appliance, enables IT organizations and cloud service providers to store, protect, preserve, and retrieve unstructured content. The Content Platform is the foundational component of the HDS cloud architecture.

=== Software ===
- Storage Management. Storage management software allows the configuration, day-to-day operation, performance tuning, and monitoring of Hitachi storage environments. Many management processes can be automated based on policies set by the storage administrator.
- Cloud Storage. Hitachi Content Platform is the foundation of the Hitachi Data Systems cloud architecture. It can be deployed in public, private, or hybrid cloud storage models.
- Replication. Hitachi software supports in-system as well as remote data replication for data migration or to meet companies’ business continuity and disaster recovery objectives.
- Data Protection. Hitachi data protection software is used to manage backups and snapshots.
- IT Operations. Hitachi IT operations software monitors the IT infrastructure and simplifies IT administration, including security and asset management, and software distribution.

==== Hitachi TrueCopy ====
Hitachi TrueCopy, formerly known as Hitachi Open Remote Copy (HORC) or Hitachi Remote Copy (HRC) or Hitachi Asynchronous Remote Copy (HARC), is a remote mirroring feature from Hitachi Data Systems storage arrays available for both open systems and IBM z/OS. Truecopy is an implementation of IBM's PPRC protocol.

Synchronous TrueCopy causes each write to the primary volume to be performed to the secondary as well, and the I/O is considered complete only when updates to both primary and secondary have been completed. Asynchronous TrueCopy stores time-stamped IO packets in the primary disk array and transfers them to the secondary array subject to link bandwidth. When the primary array's buffer is exhausted, it starts flagging tracks on the primary to be duplicated to the secondary when bandwidth permits.

Related products include:

- Hitachi Raid Manager, software to control TrueCopy operations
- Hitachi Command Control Interface (CCI)
- Veritas Cluster Server (VCS) agent for Hitachi TrueCopy

=== Services ===
- Assess and Consult. These services evaluate and assess customers’ IT environments for adoption of new technologies and can also prepare an economic justification for investments in new storage infrastructures.
- Plan and Design. Based on the customer's requirements and current IT environment, these services design and generate a plan to meet service level objectives.
- Install and Implement. These services use proven methodologies and best practices to customize, transition, and operationalize the customer's purchased storage systems and software for rapid, accurate deployment.
- Integrate and Transition. These services leverage multiple techniques to transparently migrate data to new Hitachi technologies while applications keep running.
- Manage and Optimize. These services use ITIL principles and Hitachi Data Systems' best practices to manage a customer's storage infrastructure.
- Education. Hitachi Data Systems Academy provides product and technology training courses in a variety of formats which can lead to HDS Certification in several tracks.

== Partners ==
Hitachi Data Systems has four types of partners: Technology, Global Systems Integrators, Hitachi TrueNorth Partners, and Hitachi TrueNorth Advisor Partners.
