= IBM Enterprise Storage Server =

- Also known as: IBM Shark; IBM ESS
- Developer: IBM
- Type: Storage server
- Released: 1999; 27 years ago
- Discontinued: 2004
- CPU: RISC-based
- Predecessor: IBM Versatile Storage Server
- Successor: IBM DS8000

The IBM Enterprise Storage Server (ESS) or the Shark is an enterprise storage array from IBM.

== History ==
Originally, in 1998 IBM released the IBM 2105 Versatile Storage Server (VSS). It did not meet commercial success and the successor came in 1999 in the form of the ESS, based on the same Seascape architecture. The Seascape architecture was an IBM storage architecture that included off-the-shelf components, including RS/6000 processors and the Serial Storage Architecture (SSA). The ESS was also widely known by its IBM internal codename Shark.

The 2001 lineup have a redesigned case; this version won IF design award.

It has been superseded by the IBM DS8000 series of storage servers.

== Models ==
- 2105-E10 IBM Enterprise Storage Server Model E10 - (1999) 64 disks
- 2105-E20 IBM Enterprise Storage Server Model E20 - (1999) 128 disks
- 2105-F10 IBM Enterprise Storage Server Model F10 - (2000) 64 disks
- 2105-F20 IBM Enterprise Storage Server Model F20 - (2000) 128 disks
- 2105-750 IBM TotalStorage Enterprise Storage Server Model 750 - (2001)
- 2105-800 IBM TotalStorage Enterprise Storage Server Model 800 - (2001)

=== Enclosures ===
- ESS expansion enclosure (The E10 model does not support an expansion enclosure) - 256 disks.

== See also ==
- IBM Storage
- Extended Remote Copy
- FlashCopy
- Global Mirror
- Metro Mirror
- IBM Subsystem Device Driver
- IBM TotalStorage Expert

Preceded by IBM Versatile Storage Server	IBM Enterprise Storage Server; 1999 - 2004	Succeeded by IBM System Storage DS8000
