= IBM Global Mirror =

Data replication system

Global Mirror is an IBM technology that provides data replication over extended distances between two sites for business continuity and disaster recovery. If adequate bandwidth exists, Global Mirror provides a recovery point objective (RPO) of as low as 3–5 seconds between the two sites at extended distances with no performance impact on the application at the primary site. It replicates the data asynchronously and also forms a consistency group at a regular interval allowing a clean recovery of the application.

The two sites can be on separate continents or simply on different utility grids. IBM also provides a synchronous data replication called Metro Mirror, which is designed to support replication at "Metropolitan" distances of (normally) less than 300 km.

Global Mirror is based on IBM Copy Services functions: Global Copy and FlashCopy. Global mirror periodically pauses updates of the primary volumes and swaps change recording bitmaps. It then uses the previous bitmap to drain updates from the primary volumes to the secondaries. After all primary updates have been drained, the secondary volumes are used as the source for a FlashCopy to tertiary volumes at the recovery site. This ensures that the tertiary copy of the volumes has point-in-time consistency. By grouping many volumes into one Global Mirror session multiple volumes may be copied to the recovery site simultaneously while maintaining point-in-time consistency across those volumes.

Global Mirror can be combined with a wide area network clustering product like Geographically Dispersed Parallel Sysplex (GDPS), HACMP/XD, or IBM TotalStorage Continuous Availability for Windows to provide for automated failover between sites. This combined solution provides lower recovery time objective (RTO), because it allows most applications to automatically resume productive operation in 30–600 seconds.

The Global Mirror function is available on IBM Storage devices including the DS8000 series (DS8100, DS8300, DS8700, DS8800, DS8870), the DS6800, the Enterprise Storage Server Models 800 and 750, midrange storage servers V7000, DS4000 family, and the IBM SAN Volume Controller.
