= VM-aware storage =

Computer data storage designed for virtual machine

VM-aware storage (VAS) is computer data storage designed specifically for managing storage for virtual machines (VMs) within a data center. The goal is to provide storage that is simpler to use with functionality better suited for VMs compared with general-purpose storage. VM-aware storage allows storage to be managed as an integrated part of managing VMs rather than as logical unit numbers (LUNs) or volumes that are separately configured and managed.

VM-aware storage is often used in conjunction with other VM-aware components and processes such as VM-aware computer network, VM-aware backup and VM-aware virus scanning. VM-aware storage has some similarities to and can benefit from software-defined networking, but is distinct in that the latter provides general purpose physical equipment that can be customized and configured in software whereas VM-aware storage is designed for virtual machines.

== Background ==
Adoption of server virtualization technology increased rapidly since the launch of the VMware ESX hypervisor in 2001. By 2009, IDC estimated that more VMs were being deployed than physical machines.

The ability to consolidate applications running on tens of servers in a single physical server running a hypervisor resulted in cost savings for servers as well as more automated management of the servers. Due to these advantages, by early 2010, many companies had implemented "virtualization first" policies, which stated that all new server deployments should be virtual unless there were specific reasons to use a physical server.

As virtualization decreased the cost of the server hardware, storage began to dominate the cost and complexity of virtual infrastructures. In almost all virtual management systems in the early 2000s, computing resources, such as CPU and memory, were configured and managed separately from the storage resources. Server resources were often managed by a separate team than the storage infrastructure. Configuring the servers and storage separately and trying to get them to work together often required significant advanced planning, integration and troubleshooting.

== History ==
To improve the manageability of storage, storage vendors began to make their storage more aware of the surrounding virtual components (often called the virtual infrastructure). Initial improvements consisted of scripts and plug-ins for virtual infrastructures to streamline common workflows such as allocating storage for VMs. As a result, these tasks became simpler and easier to perform.

To get further benefits and allow virtual infrastructures to better leverage underlying storage system features such as snapshots, clones (writable snapshots), replication and quality of service (QoS), hypervisor vendors began to publish and implement new storage protocols and extensions (VAAI, StorageLink) for managing storage in virtual environments.

These early steps did improve usability and efficiency of storage when used in virtual infrastructures but did not address the fundamental disconnect between virtual infrastructures and storage. Namely, virtual infrastructure is designed to manage VMs while storage was designed to manage LUNs and volumes, which have no direct relationship with VMs.

Independently of VMware, several startups also began to provide VM-aware storage products using existing virtual infrastructure management interfaces. These storage products are designed to support the same VM abstractions and allow storage management at the granularity of VMs.

VMware announced its own vSphere storage appliance in 2011. It was sold through 2014. By 2013, Tintri was using this term for its products.

== Comparison to general-purpose ==
General-purpose storage systems are designed around storage protocols such as SCSI, iSCSI, Network File System (NFS) and Server Message Block (SMB) which were created before the advent of virtualization. As a result, their fundamental management abstractions are LUNs and volumes, which have little to do with the VMs. General-purpose storage systems are configured and managed mostly independent of the virtual infrastructure. The VM abstractions are mapped onto the storage by administrators, who must then manage this mapping and create policies and processes for translating operations on VMs into corresponding operations on LUNs and volumes.

For example, because there are no standard protocols for creating and destroying LUNs and volumes, most virtual infrastructures store many VMs on a single LUN or volume to amortize provisioning and management overhead. Since general-purpose storage systems implement most storage-management functionality such as monitoring, snapshots, cloning, replication and QoS on LUNs and volumes rather than VMs and virtual disks, this means storage systems lose the ability to perform these operations on individual VMs. Advance planning becomes necessary to effectively manage storage.

In contrast, VM-aware storage is designed around VMs. As a result, any storage-management operations can be performed at the granularity of VMs and storage can be managed as an integral part of managing VMs in a virtual infrastructure.

== See also ==
- Virtual machine
- Hypervisor
- Software-defined networking (SDN)
- Direct-attached storage (DAS)
- Storage area network (SAN)
- Network-attached storage (NAS)
