= Peter Braam =

Dutch-American computer scientist

- Born: Peter J. Braam
- Scientific career
- Education: Utrecht University (1984); University of Oxford (1987)
- Known for: Lustre File System, Intermezzo File System, Coda File System
- Fields: Mathematics, Computer science
- Workplaces: University of Oxford – Wolfson College, Merton College and St Catherine's College; University of Utah; NWO – Netherlands Organisation for Scientific Research; Utrecht University; Carnegie Mellon University
- Thesis: Magnetic Monopoles and Hyperbolic Three-manifolds (1987)
- Doctoral advisor: Michael Atiyah with Johannes Duistermaat
- Website: www.braam.io

Peter J. Braam is a Dutch-American computer scientist, mathematician and entrepreneur known for his contributions to large-scale computing systems. He has held academic positions at the University of Utah, the University of Oxford and Carnegie Mellon University. Braam is recognized for creating the Lustre parallel file system, used in high-performance computing (HPC) environments.

== Early life and education ==
Braam was born in Utrecht, Netherlands. He completed his undergraduate studies at Utrecht University in 1984. He pursued doctoral research under the supervision of Sir Michael Atiyah at the University of Oxford, earning his DPhil in 1987 with a thesis titled Magnetic Monopoles and Hyperbolic Three-manifolds.

== Academic career ==
Following his doctorate, Braam became a Junior Research Fellow at Merton College, Oxford, and a C&C Huygens Fellow of the Netherlands Science Foundation.

From 2013 to 2018, Braam has collaborated with the University of Cambridge on the Square Kilometre Array radio telescope project, focusing on data-intensive computing challenges. He has also served as a consultant to partners in the founding committee of Horizon 2020 and the European Processor Initiative.

At the University of Oxford he has been a Visiting Professor in the Department of Physics since 2019, and a visiting research fellow in mathematics since 2025, and a visiting professor of computer science at Waseda University since 2022.

== Philanthrophy ==
Braam has endowed the Peter J. Braam Junior Research Fellowship and Graduate Scholarship in Human Wellbeing at Merton College, Oxford. These initiatives support early-career researchers and contribute to studies aimed at improving human wellbeing.

== Selected publications ==
- Braam, P. J.; Donaldson, S. K. (1995). "Floer's work on instanton homology, knots and surgery". The Floer Memorial Volume. Birkhäuser Basel. pp. 195–256. doi:10.1007/978-3-0348-9217-9_10. ISBN 978-3-0348-9948-2.
- Braam, P.J.; Duistermaat, J.J. (December 1993). "Normal forms of real symmetric systems with multiplicity". Indagationes Mathematicae. 4 (4): 407–421. doi:10.1016/0019-3577(93)90011-M.
- Braam, Peter J.; Maciocia, Antony; Todorov, Andrey (December 1992). "Instanton moduli as a novel map from tori to K3-surfaces". Inventiones Mathematicae. 108 (1): 419–451. Bibcode:1992InMat.108..419B. doi:10.1007/BF02100613. S2CID 17896374.

== Awards and recognition ==
- 1999 Best Paper, Systems, O'Reilly Open Source Convention, (InterMezzo)
