= OpenSFS =

- Founded: 2010
- Type: 501(c)(6)
- Location: Beaverton, Oregon, United States
- Key people: Stephen Simms
- Website: www.opensfs.org

Open Scalable File Systems, Inc. (OpenSFS) is a nonprofit organization promoting the Lustre file system. OpenSFS was founded in 2010 to ensure Lustre remains vendor-neutral, open, and free.

== History ==
The Lustre is a high-performance parallel file system deployed in computational data centers including many TOP500 systems. It first started development in 1999 under the Accelerated Strategic Computing Initiative Path Forward project and initially released in 2003. In September 2007, Sun Microsystems acquired the assets of Cluster File Systems Inc, and was itself acquired by Oracle Corporation in 2010. After announcements from Oracle before and during the 2010 Lustre User Group, ongoing development of Lustre as an open-source project was in question, prompting most Lustre developers to leave Oracle. OpenSFS was founded in October 2010 to steward an open source software Lustre community. Founding members were Cray, DataDirect Networks, Lawrence Livermore National Laboratory, and Oak Ridge National Laboratory. In April 2013 Norman Morse, who had been CEO since it was founded, resigned and was replaced by Galen Shipman of ORNL. In 2015, Charlie Carrol of Cray replaced Shipman as chairman. At the Lustre BOF at Supercomuting'16, Stephen Simms announced that stewardship of OpenSFS had been transferred from the remaining board members, Cray, Intel, and Seagate, to become a more user-driven organization. Simms assumed the role of interim president until board elections at LUG 2017 and then returned in a permanent capacity after elections at LUG 2019.

== OpenSFS Involvement in Lustre Releases ==
In 2011, Lustre 2.1 was the first community release endorsed by OpenSFS. OpenSFS began direct funding of community releases in early 2012, focused on introducing new features and targeted every six months. Maintenance releases are targeted every three months. OpenSFS solicited proposals in February 2013 for Lustre feature development, parallel file system tools, addressing Lustre technical issues, and parallel file system incubators.

OpenSFS-funded releases included Lustre 2.5 in October 2013, containing a Lustre+HSM integration capability. In 2017 it was announced that Lustre releases would adopt a Long Term Support (LTS) model with Lustre 2.10 being the first LTS release. At SC18 it was announced that Lustre 2.12 would be the next LTS release. Matters relating to the Lustre community releases are discussed at the OpenSFS Lustre Working Group.

== Lustre User Group ==
Since 2011 OpenSFS has been in charge of organizing the annual Lustre User Group (LUG) event, traditionally held in April or May, for discussion and seminars on Lustre. The 2020 LUG was replaced by a webinar series in light of restrictions around travel and group meetings due to the global COVID-19 pandemic.
