= XRC =

XRC may refer to:

- XML Resource, a user interface markup language used by wxWidgets
- Extended Remote Copy, a technology for data replication
- X-ray crystallography, a scientific technique for analysing molecular crystal structure using X-rays.
