= PPRC =

PPRC may refer to:

- Peer to Peer Remote Copy
- Pharmacopoeia of the People's Republic of China
- Port Pirie Regional Council, South Australia
- Power and Participation Research Centre, an independent non-profit organization based in Dhaka, Bangladesh
- Paddy Processing Research Centre, a former name of the Indian Institute of Food Processing Technology
