= IBM storage =

Product portfolio of IBM

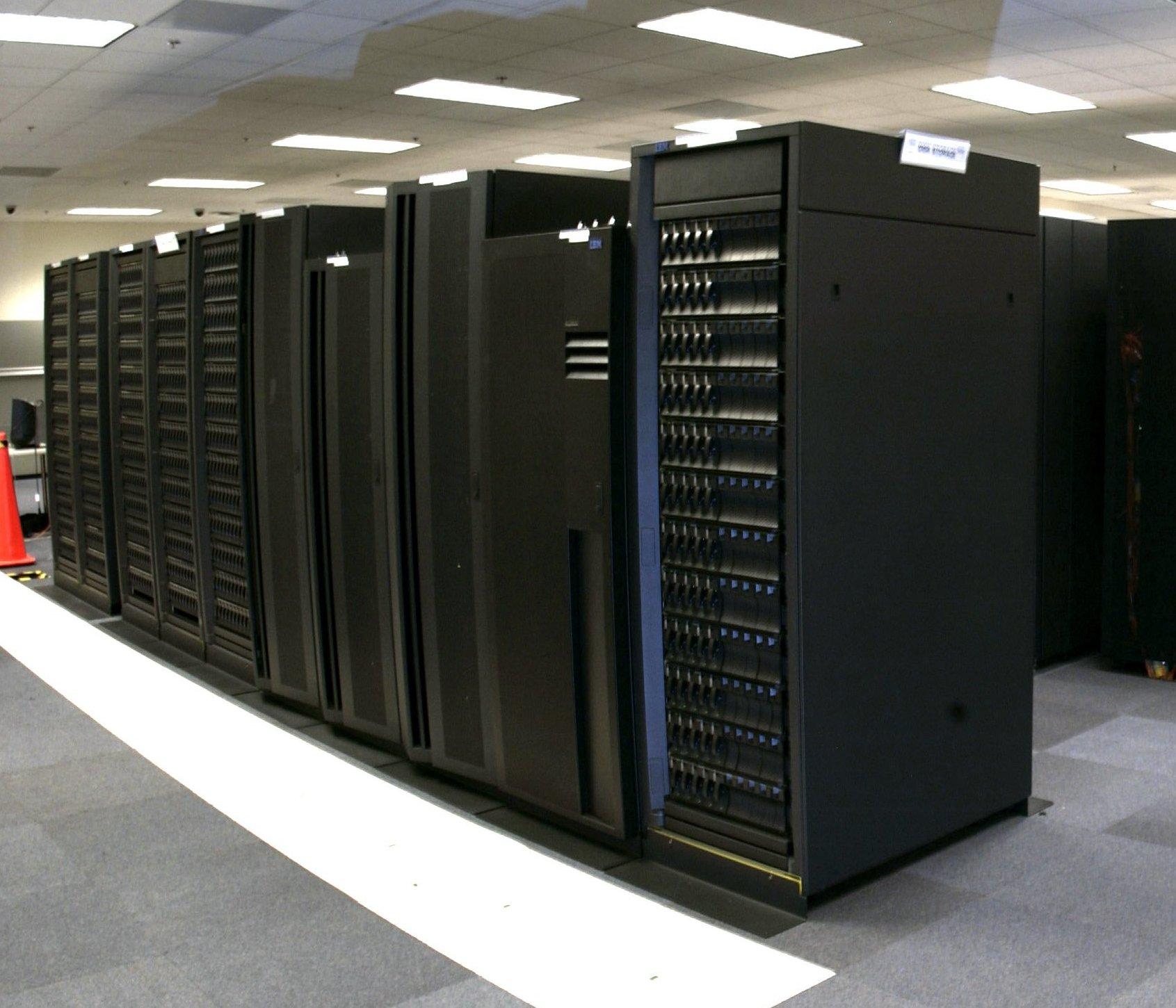
Various IBM storage servers

The IBM Storage product portfolio includes disk, flash, tape, NAS storage products, storage software and services. IBM's approach is to focus on data management.

== Software ==
=== IBM Spectrum Storage ===
IBM Spectrum Storage portfolio can centrally manage more than 300 different storage devices and yottabytes of data.

==== IBM Spectrum Accelerate ====
The functionality of Spectrum Accelerate is based on the IBM XIV, a high-end disk storage system. IBM Spectrum Accelerate and XIV run the same base software stack and interoperate with features such as management, remote replication and volume mobility.

==== IBM Spectrum Scale ====
IBM Spectrum Scale is software-defined storage for cloud and analytics.

The product is very widely used in both commercial and academic environments. It has a history going back to the mid 1990s. It was known as GPFS before IBM re-branded all storage products in 2015.

==== IBM Spectrum Virtualize ====
IBM Spectrum Virtualize is a block storage virtualization system. Because the IBM Storwize V7000 uses SVC code, it can also be used to perform storage virtualization in exactly the same way as SVC. Since mid-2012 it offers real time compression with no performance impact, saving up to 80% of disk utilization. SVC can be configured on a Stretched Cluster Mode, with automatic fail over between two data centers, and can have SSD that can be used by EasyTier software to perform sub-LUN automatic tearing.

==== IBM Spectrum Control ====
IBM Spectrum Control provides infrastructure management for virtualized, cloud and software-defined storage.

==== IBM Spectrum Protect ====
IBM Spectrum Protect is a progression of the Tivoli Storage Management product.

==== IBM Spectrum Archive ====
IBM Spectrum Archive allows users to run any application designed for disk files against tape data without concern for the fact that the data is physically stored on tape.

IBM offers four options:

- IBM LTFS Single Drive Edition – access and manage data on a standalone tape drive as if the data were on disk
- IBM LTFS Library Edition – access and manage data on single or multiple cartridges in a tape library
- IBM LTFS Storage Manager – manage both online and offline files in IBM tape libraries
- IBM LTFS Enterprise Edition – run applications designed for disk files from tape storage

=== IBM SmartCloud Storage Access ===
IBM SmartCloud Storage Access is a software application designed to create a private cloud storage service on existing storage devices. The software can be configured to allow users self-service, Internet-based access for account creation, storage provisioning and file management. The software offers simple management with monitoring and reporting capabilities, including storage usage by user and group definitions.

=== Active Cloud Engine ===
The Active Cloud Engine (ACE) is a form of multiple site replication. ACE is designed to allow different types of cloud implementations to exchange data dynamically. ACE is designed to extend the SONAS capability for a single, centrally managed namespace, to a truly distributed, geographically dispersed, global namespace.

=== IBM Easy Tier ===
IBM Easy Tier is designed to automate data placement throughout the disk pool to improve the efficiency and performance of the storage system. Easy Tier is designed to relocate data (at the extent level) across up to three drive tiers automatically and without disruption to application. IBM Easy Tier is available on the DS8000, Storwize (V7000, V7000 Unified, V5000, V3700 lines) and SAN Volume Controller.

== Current hardware ==
After 2019, IBM dropped the HDD and SSD-based storage server series and all current lines provide only flash-oriented or tape-oriented solutions.

=== Flash storage ===
==== IBM FlashSystem ====
IBM FlashSystem is a range of dedicated, non-SSD "all-flash" storage systems, based on a Intel x86 platform.

IBM acquired flash storage system maker Texas Memory Systems in 2012. In April 2013, IBM announced a plan for a $1 billion investment in flash storage research and development, and then the product line-up was renewed in 2014 with the announcement of the FlashSystem 840 and FlashSystem V840. IBM has been updating these models every year. The former IBM FlashSystem had 1U-size solutions only, but the current lineup contains rackable systems with 1U, 2U or 6U form-factor, and based on a 6U modules cabinet-size solution.

In 2017, FlashSystem brand replaced the XIV brand, and in 2020, FlashSystem replaced the Storwize brand.

IBM Data Engine for NoSQL – is an integrated black-box device combining an IBM PowerLinux server with FlashSystem modules attached as non-volatile memory extension (not as storage).The integrated system offers large capacity NoSQL services based on pre-loaded Redis, Cassandra and Neo4J, up to 57 TB in-memory instances.

==== DS servers ====
IBM Power-based storage series, that offers specialized advanced functions optimized for IBM Power Systems and IBM Z servers; This line early known as System Storage DS series, and former TotalStorage DS series; current models slowly dropped the "System Storage" naming prior to simple line names (DS#### for flash systems, TS#### for tape storage). Currently DS series contains only DS8000 sub-line.

DS8000 series The DS8000 line formerly offers only as an assembled cabinet-size solution, but current line-up contains half-rack mountable model. The DS8000 also can use self-encrypting drives for every drive tier to help secure data at rest.

=== Tape and virtual tape systems ===
==== TS libraries and servers ====
Like the similar DS storage series, the tape system lines early known as System Storage TS series or former TotalStorage TS series and based on a IBM POWER controllers.

TS7000 series

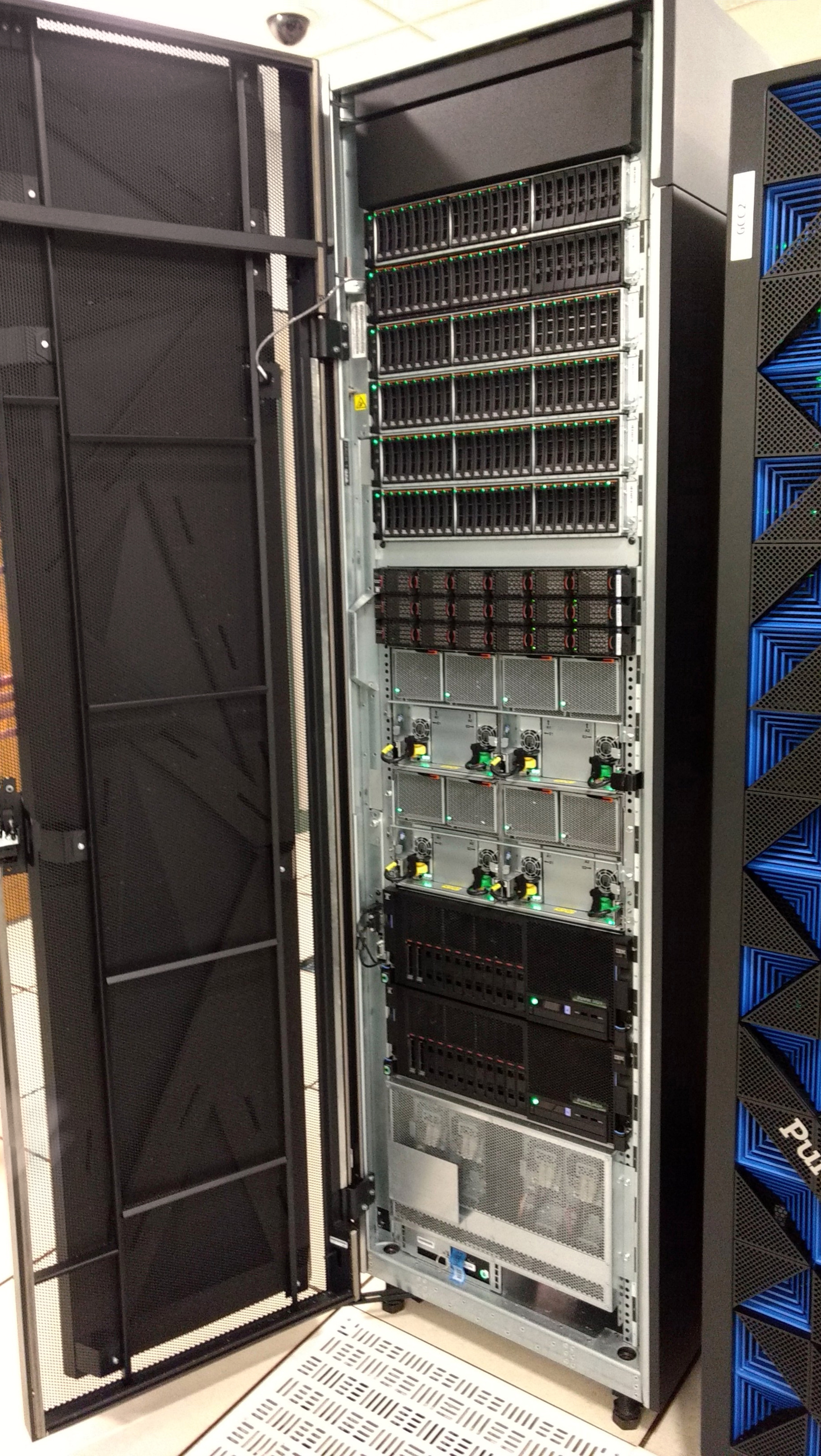
IBM TS7700 opened

Mainframe-oriented virtual tape library series, TS7700 line released in 20## as System Storage 7700, updated in 201#, 2016, 2018 and 2020.
Like the DS8000 series, current models can be offered as assembled rack-size solution, or as half-rack rack-mountable system.

TS4500

General purpose tape library series.
The IBM® TS4500 Tape Library is designed to help midsized and large enterprises respond to cloud storage challenges. It incorporates the latest generation of industry-leading linear tape-open (LTO) and IBM enterprise class technology that will help organizations handle the growing data demands of modern tape use cases. including data volume growth, rising storage footprint costs, data migration efforts and the increased complexity of IT training and management as staff resources shrink.

TS4300

IBM® TS4300 Tape Library is a high-density, highly scalable, easy-to-manage solution designed to keep data securely stored long-term, while helping reduce the costs associated with data center space and utilities. Its modular design enables you to increase cartridge and drive capacity as needed—scale vertically up to seven modules with expansion for Linear Tape-Open (LTO) Ultrium cartridges, drives and redundant power supplies. IBM TS4300 enhanced modern data protection helps meet security and compliance requirements.

TS2900

The IBM® TS2900 Tape Autoloader is an entry-level automated backup for rack systems and small to midsize businesses. With a low-profile, high-density storage capacity, the TS2900 is ideally suited for backup and archival operations. The TS2900 is available with half-height LTO Ultrium tape technology, with 6 Gbps SAS drive options. Web-based remote management and a bar code reader help provide ease of use. The TS2900 can be used in a rack system or on a desktop next to a server in an office.

==== TS readers ====
TS2230 series

The IBM System Storage TS2230 Tape Drive, Model Type 3580, Model H3V, is a high-performance, high-capacity data-storage device that is designed to backup and restore open systems applications. It is the third generation in the Ultrium series of products, and is available with a Serial Attached SCSI interface (SAS). This model incorporates the Linear Tape-Open (LTO) IBM Ultrium 3 Half-High Tape Drive.

TS1150 series

The IBM TS1150 tape drive gives organizations an easy way to deliver fast access to data, improve security and provide long-term retention—and for less expense than disk solutions. TS1150 offers high-performance, flexible data storage with support for data encryption. This fifth-generation drive can help protect investments in tape automation by offering compatibility with existing automation. Plus, an upgrade model is available for existing IBM TS1140 tape drives. What’s more, TS1150 supports the LTFS format in IBM Spectrum Archive for direct, intuitive and graphical access to data.

Preceded by IBM Storwize	IBM FlashSystem; 2013 - current
Preceded by IBM XIV Storage System	IBM FlashSystem; 2013 - current
Preceded by TMS RamSan	IBM FlashSystem; 2013 - current
Preceded by IBM System Storage DS	IBM DS8000; 2019 - current
Preceded by IBM System Storage TS	IBM TS series 2019 - current

== Withdrawn hardware – x86 lines ==
=== PureData servers ===
Was introduced in 2012 for replacing the Netezza line.

=== Flash storage ===
==== IBM DeepFlash ====
- DeepFlash 150 – is an ultra-high density SSD, based on a SanDisk InfiniFlash IF100 drawer (holding up to 0.5 PB of Flash capacity in 3U rack space) and IBM Spectrum Scale software. It is directly attached via SAS to a maximum of 8 servers used as application cluster or as integrated device running some SDS storage management software. Its design point is lowest price per reliable capacity. In contrast, for lowest price per IOPS or best latency per invest, consider storage built around FlashSystem modules. Introduced in 2016.
- DeepFlash Elastic Storage Server – an integrated device combining one or two DeepFlash 150 drawers with IBM Spectrum Scale software for Exascale storage repositories with analytics capabilities (Hadoop, CCTV, analytics archive, media server etc.). The DeepFlash-ESS can be clustered non-disruptively with existing IBM Elastic Storage Servers, up to a theoretical limit of 8000 clustered devices. It features file (NFS, SMB), object (Swift, S3) and Hadoop transparent access. Spectrum Scale offers automated data placement and lifecycle management from Memory to Flash to Disk to Tape, besides geographically distributed caching and replication.

==== Other flash storage capabilities ====
High IOPS PCIe Adapters – PCIe card adapters for former IBM System x servers, offering capacities up to 2.4 TB. Moved to Lenovo.

=== HDD/SSD storage – For entry and midrange workloads ===
==== IBM XIV ====
The IBM XIV Storage System was configured as cabinet-size solution and designed to work well in cloud and virtualized environments. The last XIV Gen3 model offers 2, 3, 4 or 6 TB drives, providing up to 485 TB of usable capacity per rack. SSD caching (available as an option) adds up to 12 TB of management-free high-performance data caching capability to the entire array. The system can also connect to external storage via Fibre Channel (8 Gbit/s) and iSCSi (1 or 10 Gbit/s). The XIV line was replaced by IBM FlashSystem line.

==== IBM Storwize family ====
The Storwize family of storage controllers shares the software with the IBM SAN Volume Controller and offers the same functionality with few exceptions. Storwize systems are capable of external virtualization, and oriented for technology migration and investment protection for aging systems. Storwize advanced caching, free-of-charge Easy Tier (automatic data placement) and automatic hotspot elimination help infuse a second life to previous-generation storage systems. Modern virtualization functions like inline real-time compression for data on external systems can help delay capacity repurchase for several years.

- Storwize V7000 series – announced in 2010, is a compact (2U rack-mount enclosure) virtualizing storage system that inherits IBM SAN Volume Controller (SVC) functionality.
  - Storwize V7000 Gen1 – can attach to storage clients via FCP (8 and 16 Gbit/s), FCoE or iSCSI (1 or 10 Gbit/s) protocols and can use Real-time Compression to reduce disk space usage by up to 80 percent.
  - Storwize V7000 Gen2 and Gen2 turbo, each a technology upgrade with increased throughput and number of drives support: 720 slots per single controller or 3040 per clustered controller.
  - Storwize V7000F – designed for SSD-only operations.
  - Storwize V7000 Unified combines two head units running IBM Storwize File Module Software with the IBM Storwize V7000 block storage system. It is described as unified storage because it simultaneously implements NAS protocols (such as SMB and NFS) and block storage. It leverages IBM Spectrum Scale software capabilities.
  - Storwize V7000 Gen3 – last upgrade of V7000 line, before merging to FlashSystem in 2020.
- Storwize V5000 series – announced in 2013, is a mid-range virtualizing storage system offering many of the features of the V7000 in a 2U rack-mount enclosure.
  - Storwize V5000 – supports 6 Gbit SAS and 1 Gbit iSCSI host attachment and either 8 Gbit FC or 10 Gbit iSCSI/FCoE host attachment. The system can support up to 480 drives with nineteen expansion enclosures, and up to 960 drives in a two-way cluster configuration.
  - Storwize V5000 Gen2, a technology upgrade with increased number of drives support. It is available as V5010, V5020, and V5030 with mutual in-place upgrade capability.
  - Storwize V5000F – designed for SSD-only operations.
  - Storwize V5000 Gen3 – last upgrade of v5000 line, before merging to FlashSystem in 2020.
- Storwize V3700 – announced in 2012, is an entry-level 2U system, oriented for the block storage needs of small and midsize businesses. This system offers consolidating and sharing data capabilities previously available in more expensive systems.

Transparent Cloud Tiering for Swift- and S3-compatible object datastores can be used as a cold tier for incremental volume snapshots and volume archives without live production access. This allows keeping hourly time machine copies or archiving VM images including attached volumes at a price point somewhat closer to tape media. Supported on-premise datastores include IBM Cloud Object Store (aka Cleversafe) and IBM Spectrum Scale object. Off-premise datastores would be popular S3-compatible cloud services like IBM Bluemix (aka Cleversafe cloud). Off-premise Transparent Cloud Tiering per default uses AES encryption, which is a licensed feature.

=== HDD/SSD storage – High density rack systems ===
IBM Storwize High-Density Expansion 5U92 for Storwize V5000 Gen2, V7000 and SAN Volume Controller, attaching via 12 Gb SAS lanes. This high density carrier hosts 92 hot-swappable large form factor drives in 5U rack height. Use cases include general footprint reduction, active archives, streaming media applications, or big data warehouses.

Peak performance figures are equivalent to four chained 2U Storwize EXP 12 Gb SAS expansions, at equal total number (and type) of drives.

Preceded by none	IBM Storwize; 2011 - 2020	Succeeded by IBM FlashSystem
Preceded by XIV Nextra	IBM XIV Storage System; 2007 - 2018	Succeeded by IBM FlashSystem
Preceded by none	TMS RamSan; 2001 - 2013	Succeeded by IBM FlashSystem

== Withdrawn hardware – POWER and early RISC lines ==
=== Flash storage ===
Some System Storage DS8000 Series (models DS8###F)

=== HDD/SSD storage ===
- System Storage (2006–2019)
  - N7000 series
  - N6000 series
  - N3000 series
  - DS300 (iSCSI controller)
  - DS400 (FC Attached controller, using SCSI drives)
  - DS3000 Series
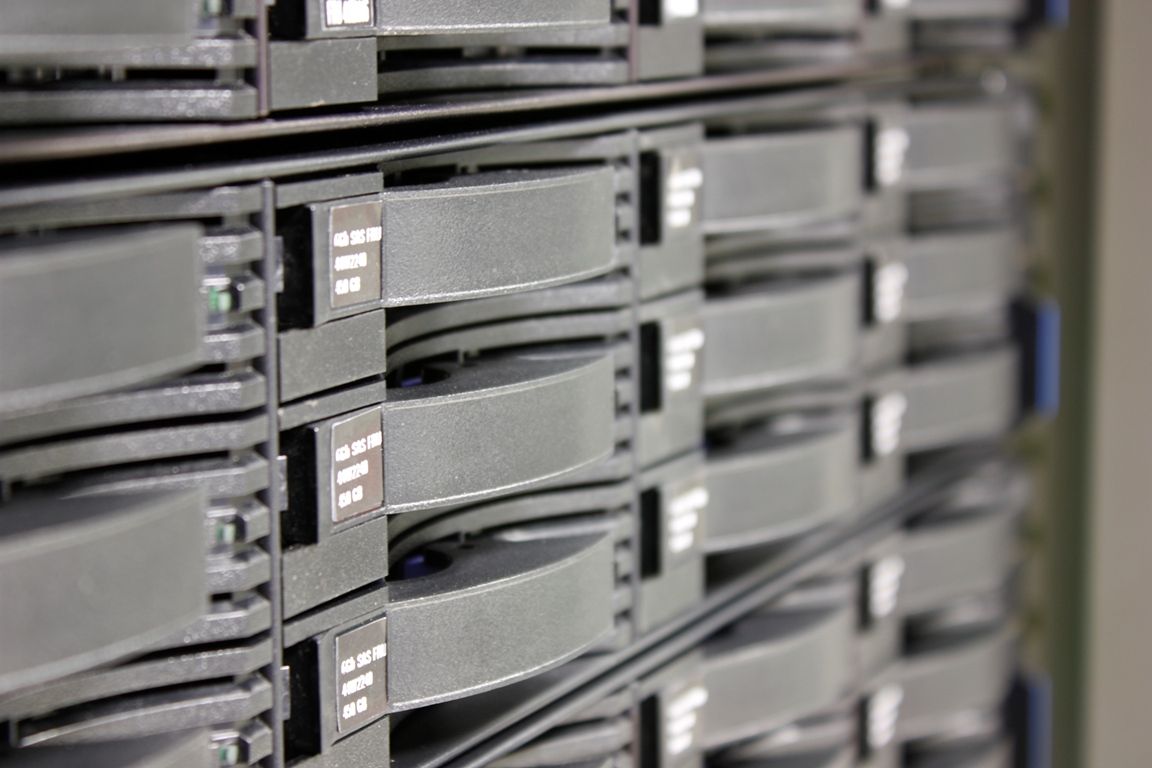
    IBM DS3200 nodes
    - DS3200
    - DS3400
    - DS3500
  - DS4000 Series
    - DS4500
    - DS4700
    - DS4800
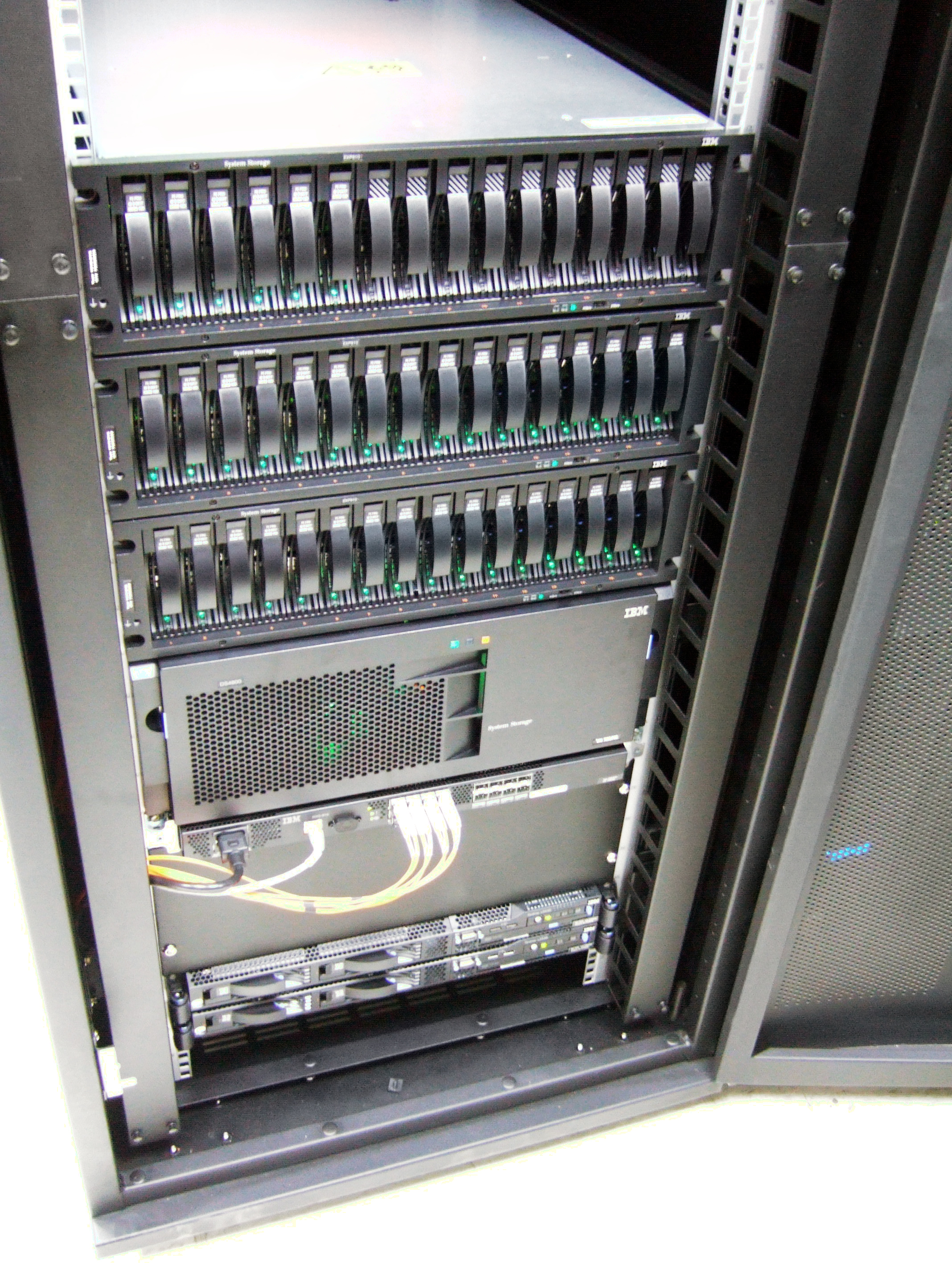
      IBM System Storage DS4800 and expansions
  - DS5000 Series
    - DS5020
    - DS5100
    - DS5300
  - DS6000 Series
    - DS6800
      - Enterprise storage, with both FC and FICON host connection
      - PowerPC 750 dual-controller with 8 host ports and 8 drive ports
      - 3U enclosure with 16 FC drive bays
      - Attached up to 128 drives using DS6000 expansion units (1750-EX1 and 1750-EX2)
  - DS8000 Series
  - DCS3700
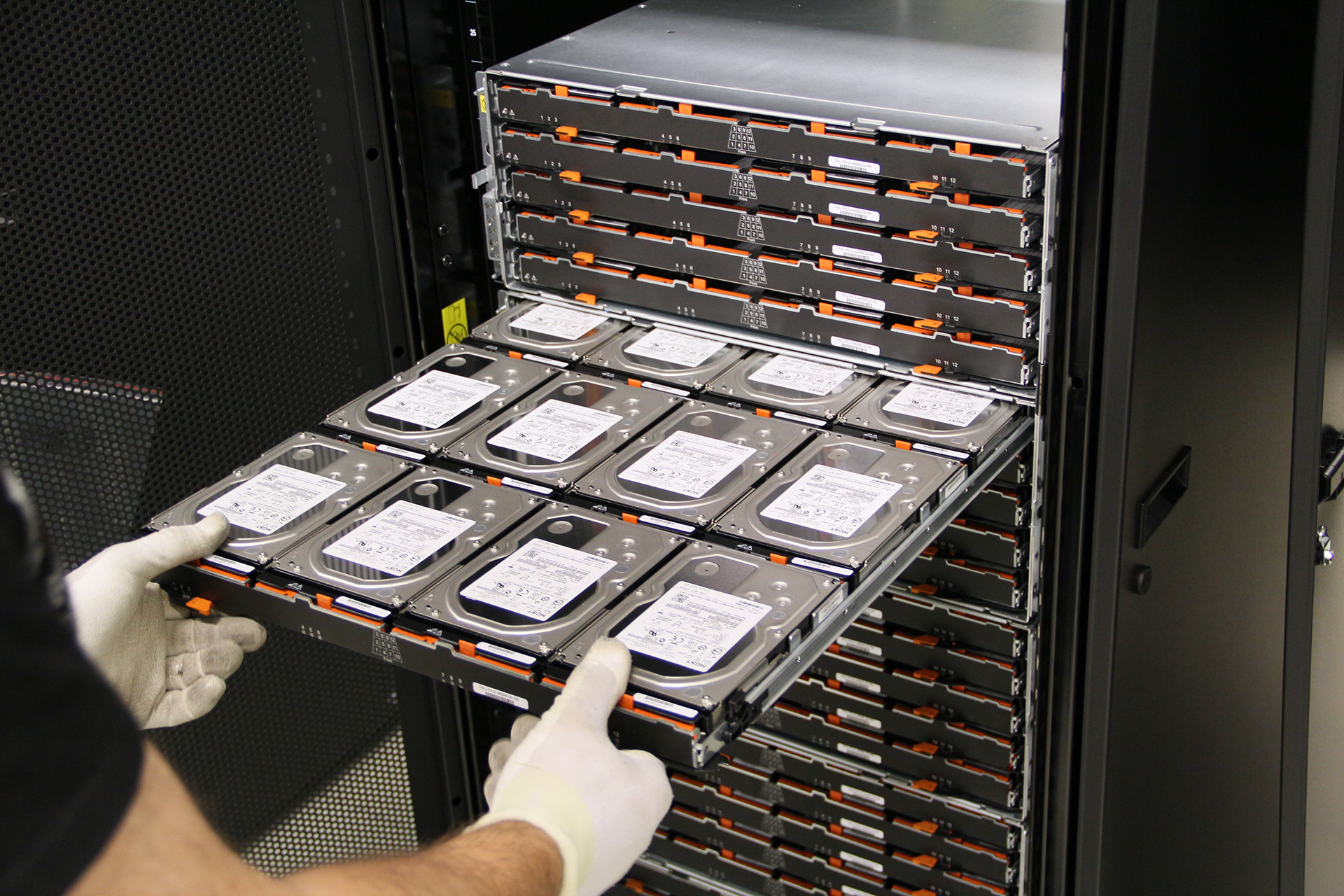
    IBM System Storage DCS3700 server node
  - DCS9550 (based on the DataDirect Networks S2A9550)
  - Expansions
    - EXP710 (2 Gbit FC Expansion drawer for DS4000 attachment)
    - EXP810 (4 Gbit FC Expansion drawer for DS4000 attachment)
- TotalStorage (2001–2006)
  - DS4000 Series
    - DS4100 (FC Attached controller, using SATA drives)
    - DS4200
    - DS4300
    - DS4300 Turbo
    - DS4400
  - FAStT Series (renamed to TotalStorage DS4000 Series in 2004)
    - EXP200 (1 Gbit FC Expansion drawer for FAStT attachment)
    - EXP500 (1 Gbit FC Expansion drawer for FAStT attachment)
    - FAStT100 (renamed to DS4100)
    - FAStT200
    - FAStT500
    - FAStT600 (renamed to DS4300)
    - FAStT600 Turbo (renamed DS4300 Turbo)
    - FAStT700 (renamed to DS4400)
    - FAStT900 (renamed to DS4500)
  - Latest Enterprise Storage Server (renamed to TotalStorage DS8000 Series)
  - Expansions
    - EXP700 (2 Gbit FC Expansion drawer for DS4000 attachment)
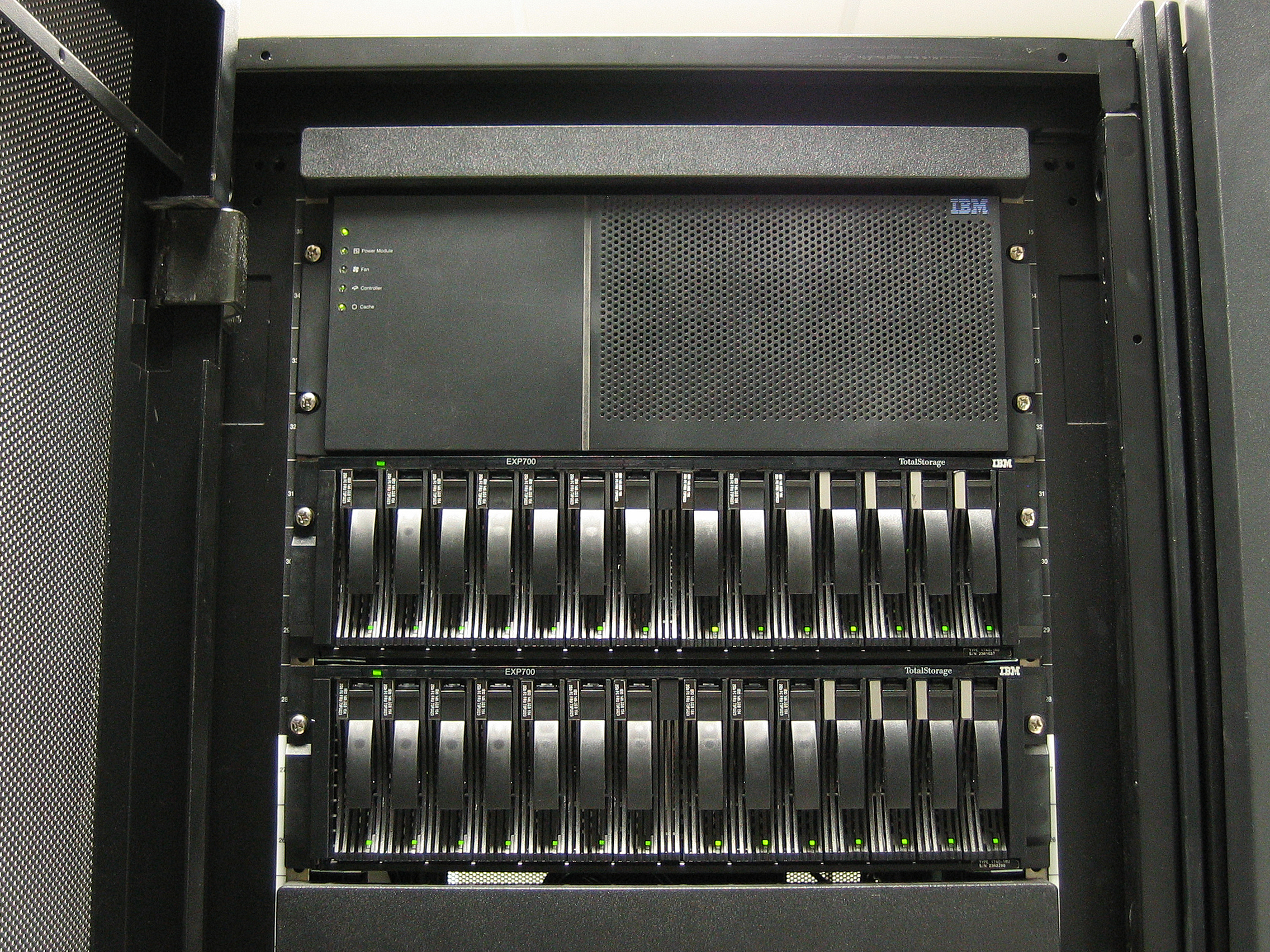
      IBM TotalStorage DS4400 with two EXP700 expansion units
    - EXP300 (SCSI Ultra160 Expansion drawer for direct host attachment)
    - EXP400 (SCSI Ultra320 Expansion drawer for direct host or DS400 attachment)
    - EXP100 (1 Gbit FC Expansion drawer for DS4000 attachment, using SATA disks)
- Enterprise Storage Server (or ESS, or Shark; predecessor of DS8000 Series)
- STN6800
- STN6500

==== SONAS ====
IBM Scale Out Network Attached Storage (SONAS) was the IBM enterprise x86-based storage platform based on GPFS technology, and released in 2010 as hardware product. This system implements NAS based protocols over a large-scale global name space. Today the system can scale out using commodity components to 30 balanced nodes and up to 21 PB of storage in 2011. The 2013 lineup was based on a DCS3700 storage line. GPFS gives the SONAS system with built-in ILM and tight integration with Tivoli Storage Manager helps move data to disk pools.

=== For enterprise workloads ===
==== TS4500 Tape Library ====
High density tape library supporting Linear Tape-Open (LTO) 5 and 6 or TS1140 and TS1150 drives. Can scale up to 35.5 PB of native capacity with 3592 cartridges and up to 11.7 PB with LTO 6 cartridges. Supports up to 5.5 PB in 10 sq ft.

==== TS3500 Tape Library ====
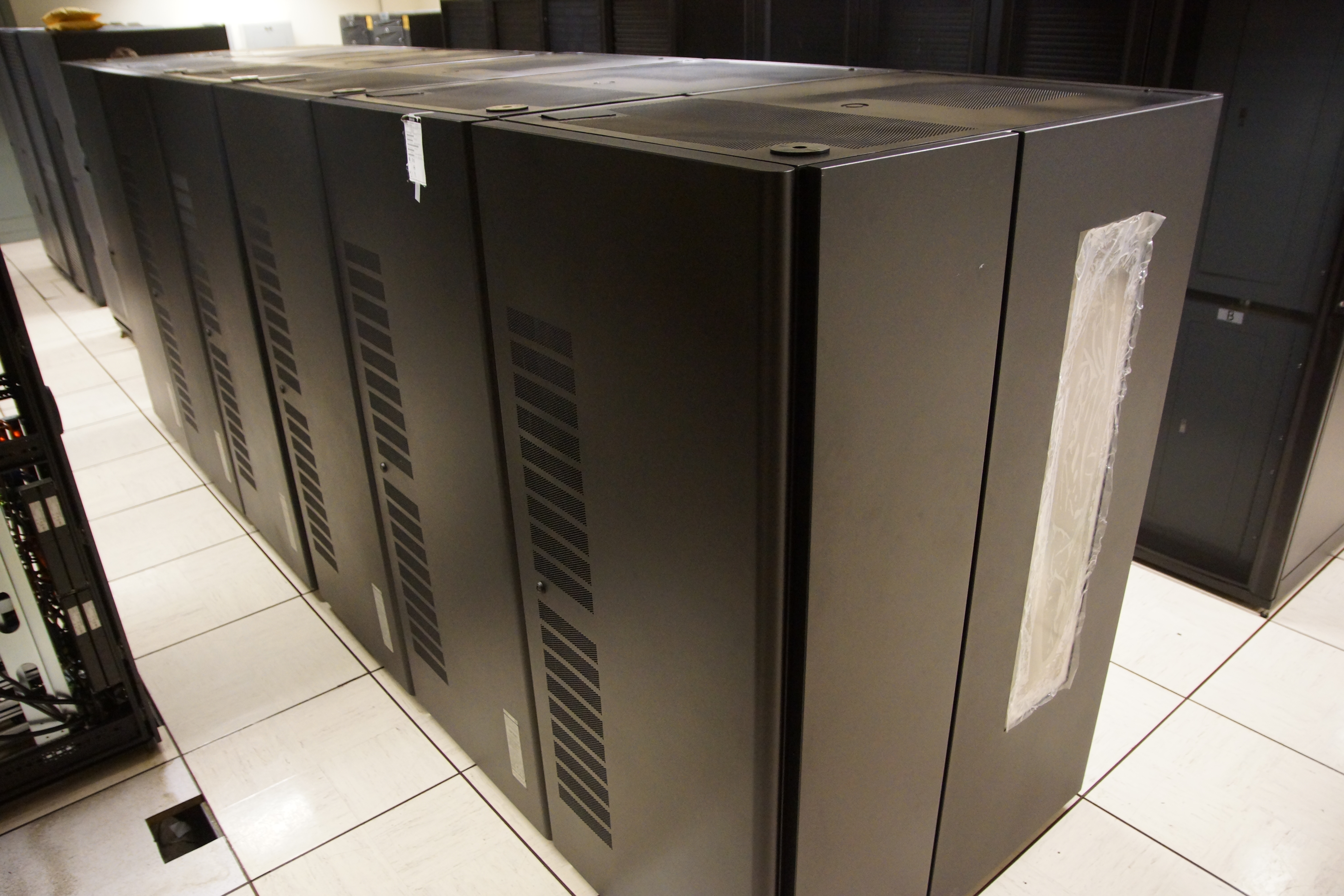
IBM TS3500 D53 tape library - 6 frames

Highly scalable tape library supporting Linear Tape-Open (LTO) or TS11x0 drives. Can scale up to 16 frames, 192 drives and over 20,000 cartridges capacity per library string or up to 2,700 drives per library complex.

==== Tape drives ====
- TS1140 – Tape drive that uses 3592 media.
- TS1060 – LTO tape drive that uses LTO generation 6 technology for use in TS3500 tape libraries.

=== For entry and midrange workloads ===
==== Tape libraries ====
- TS3310 – Expandable library with up to 18 LTO drives. (409 cartridges maximum with expansion modules.)
- TS3200 – Up to four LTO drive library using half-height drive assemblies (48 cartridges) or up to two with full-height drives.
- TS3100 – Up to two LTO drive library using half-height drive assemblies (24 cartridges) or one full-height drive.

==== Tape drives ====
- The IBM System Storage TS2900 Tape Autoloader – Designed for entry-level automation for backup and archiving in small-to-medium business environments. The TS2900 is available with IBM Linear Tape-Open (LTO) Half-High SAS tape technology.
- TS2360 – Full-height external standalone or rack mountable shelf unit with a native physical capacity of 2.5 TB. The IBM Ultrium 6 technology is designed to support media partitioning, IBM Linear Tape File System (LTFS) technology and encryption of data and WORM cartridges.
- TS2260 – Half-height external standalone or rack mountable shelf unit with a native physical capacity of 2.5 TB.

==== Virtual tape libraries ====
- TS7620 ProtecTIER Deduplication Appliance – Preconfigured repository that can be configured with either a Virtual Tape Library or Symantec OpenStorage interface with a capacity of up to 35 TB.
- IBM Virtualization Engine TS7700 series – The TS7700 is a virtual tape library for System z (mainframe) that uses disk drives for cache to accelerate backup operations. The design is intended to protect data while having shorter backup windows. End-to-end encryption protects data in motion, on cache hard drives and on tape. TS7740 and TS7720 are designed to speed up tape backups and restores by using a tiered hierarchy of disk and tape to make more efficient use of tape drives.
- IBM System Storage TS7650G ProtecTIER Deduplication Gateway – Designed to meet the disk-based data protection needs of the enterprise data center while reducing costs. The system offers inline deduplication performance and scalability up to 1 petabyte (PB) of physical storage capacity per system that can provide up to 25 PB or more backup storage capacity.

Preceded by
IBM ESS
IBM TS, IBM SS
2004 - 2019

	TotalStorage	System Storage	
Flash:	—N/a		DS8000 series
HDD/SSD:	DS8000 series		
HDD/SSD:	DS6000 series		
HDD/SSD:	—N/a	DCS3700	—N/a
HDD/SSD:	—N/a	DS5000, DS4000, DS3000 series	—N/a
Tape:	—N/a	TS7000 series	
Tape:	TS3000, TS4000 series		
Tape:	TS1000, TS2000 series		

Succeeded by
IBM DS8000
Preceded by
IBM FAStT
Preceded by
IBM Magstar and
IBM Magstar MP tape storages
Succeeded by
IBM TS series

== See also ==
- List of IBM products
- History of IBM magnetic disk drives
- IBM XIV Storage System
- IBM SAN Volume Controller
- IBM Storwize family
- IBM FlashSystem
- IBM Tivoli Storage Manager
