= IBM DS8000 series =

Storage media platform

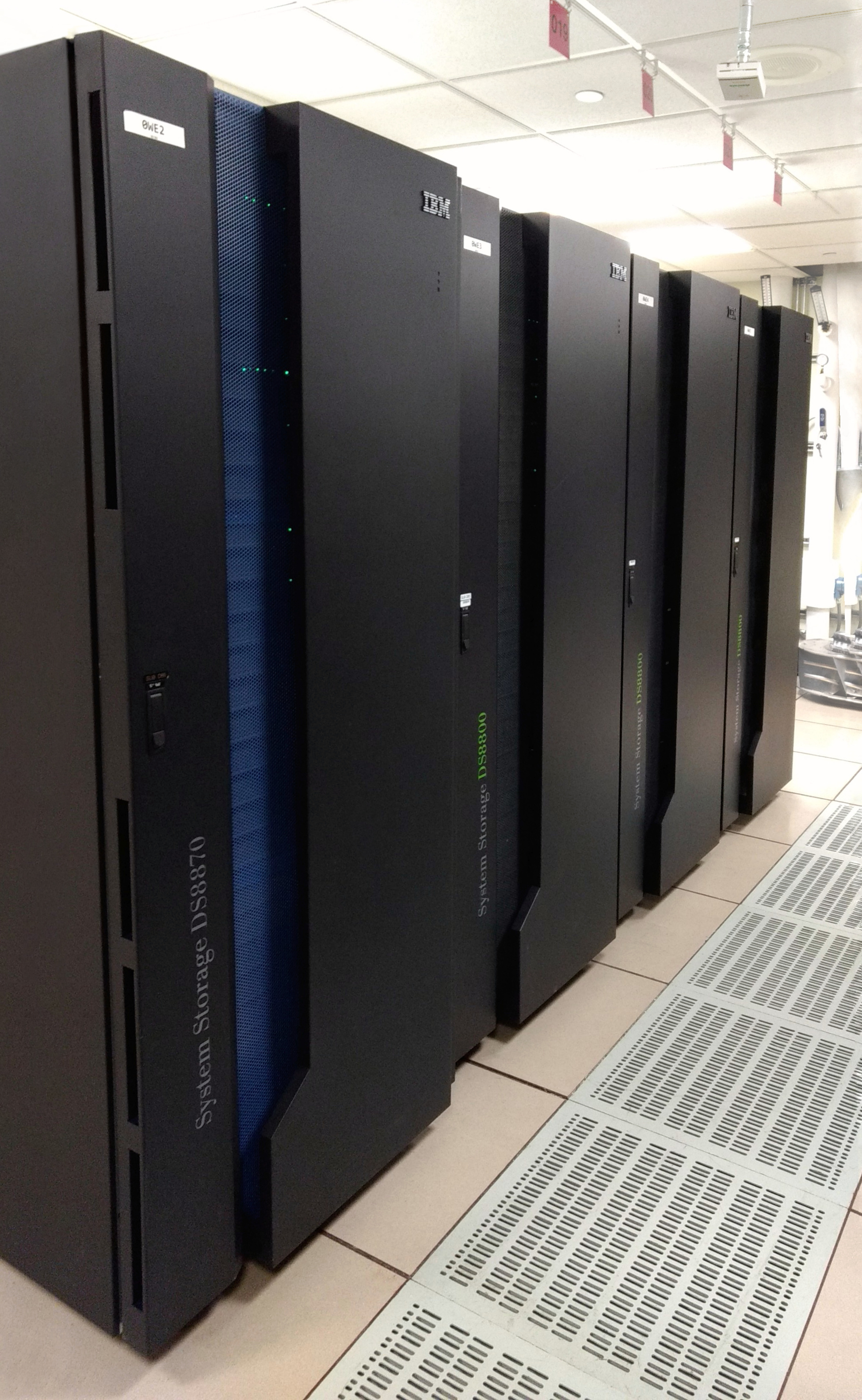
- Three DS8800 and one DS8870 servers
- Also known as: IBM TotalStorage DS8000 series (2004-2006); IBM System Storage DS8000 series (2006-2019)
- Developer: IBM
- Type: Storage server
- Released: 2004; 22 years ago
- CPU: RISC-based (IBM Power)
- Predecessor: IBM Enterprise Storage Server
- Related: IBM DS3000, DS4000, DS6000 series
- Website: ibm.com/products/ds8000

The IBM DS8000 series (early IBM System Storage DS8000 series) is an IBM storage media platform with hybrid flash and hard disk storage for IBM mainframes and other enterprise grade computing environments.

== Description ==
This series was formerly designed as a line of cabinet-size solutions, prior to the more compact and affordable rack-mount DS6000 series. In 2015 the DS6000 line were discontinued, and the all-flash entry-level DS8882F model was released as a rack-mount successor of DS6000 line.

All IBM DS storage lines are based on an IBM Power CPU and use IBM Power Systems servers as controllers.

== Models ==
DS8000 series model list
		TotalStorage			System Storage														DS8###	
Position	Form factor	Before	2004	2005	2006	2007	2008	2009	2010	2011	2012	2013	2014	2015	2016	2017	2018	2019	2020	2021
Entry	Rack cabinet													8884						
Mid-range	Rack cabinet	IBM ESS	8100		8100 Turbo			8700	8800		8870			8886						
Mid-range	Rack cabinet	IBM ESS	8100		8100 Turbo			8700	8800		8870			8886F					8950F	
Hi-end	Rack cabinet	IBM ESS	8300		8300 Turbo			8700	8800		8870			8888						
Hi-end	Rack cabinet										8870			8888F					8980F	
Rack-mount		IBM FAStT	DS6000											8882F					8910F	

- TotalStorage models:
  - DS8100 - released in 2004
    - Dual 2-core POWER5+-based controllers
    - Can contain up to 384 drives (Fibre Channel or SATA)
  - DS8300 - released in 2004
    - Dual 4-core POWER5+-based controllers (based on p570 servers)
    - Can contain up to 1024 drives (Fibre Channel or SATA)
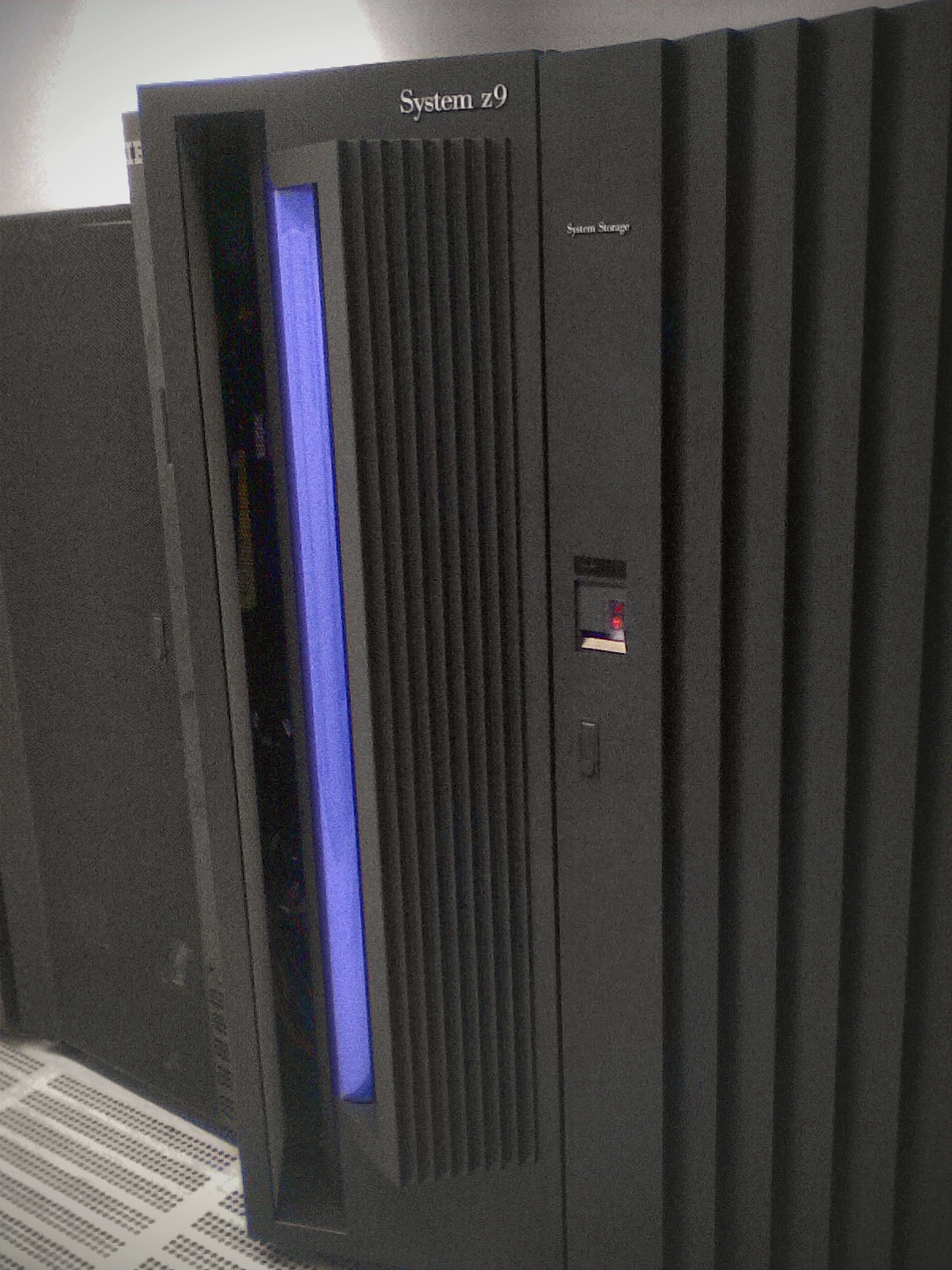
- IBM System z9 mainframe with DS8100 Turbo or DS8300 Turbo server attached
  System Storage models:
  - DS8100 Turbo - released in 2006
  - DS8300 Turbo - released in 2006
  - DS8700 - released in 2009
    - Dual 2- or 4-core POWER6-based controllers
    - Can contain up to 1024 drives (3.5” 15K RPM Fibre Channel HDD or enterprise flash drives)
  - DS8800 - released in 2010
    - Dual 2- or 4-core POWER6+-based controllers
    - Can contain up to 1536 drives (2.5": 10K or 15K RPM HDD or SSD enterprise flash SAS-2 drives, or 3.5": Nearline-SAS drives)
  - DS8870 - released in 2012
    - Dual 2-, 4-, 8- or 16-core POWER7-based controllers (Since December 2013 based on POWER7+)
      - Running SMT-4 for 64 threads
    - 1 TiB Cache
    - Can contain up to 1536 drives (2.5": 10K or 15K RPM HDD or enterprise flash SAS-2, or 3.5": Nearline-SAS drives) + 120 1.8" flash cards in the High-Performance Flash Enclosure (HPFE)
    - High Performance Flash Enclosure: integrates and optimizes flash technology in the DS8870 (High-performance flash enclosure fits into existing DS8870 bay)
      - Up to 8 Flash Enclosures per System : 96 TB raw per system
  - DS8880 Family - released in end of 2015; base models with mixed storage (DS8884 and DS8886) and all-flash solutions (DS888#F).
    - DS8882F - all-flash version for rack-mounting (17U, 16U without KVM)
    - DS8884
      - Dual 6-core POWER8-based controllers
        - Running SMT-4 for 24 threads
      - Up to 256 GiB Cache
      - Can contain up to 783 HDD or SSD drives + 120 1.8" flash cards in the High-Performance Flash Enclosure (HPFE)
        - 2.5" 10K or 15K RPM drives and enterprise flash SAS-2 drives
        - 3.5" Nearline-SAS drives
      - High Performance Flash Enclosure: integrates and optimizes flash technology in the DS8884F (Flash enclosure can fits into existing DS8870 bay)
        - Up to 4 Flash Enclosures per System : 48 TB raw per system
    - DS8886
      - Dual 8- to 24-core POWER8-based controllers
        - Running SMT-4 for 96 threads
      - Up to 2 TiB Cache
      - Can contain up to 1536 HDD or SSD drives + 240 1.8" flash cards in the High-Performance Flash Enclosure (HPFE)
        - 2.5" 10K or 15K RPM drives and enterprise flash SAS-2 drives
        - 3.5" Nearline-SAS drives
      - High Performance Flash Enclosure: integrates and optimizes flash technology in the DS8886F
        - Up to 8 Flash Enclosures per System : 96 TB raw per system
    - DS8888F
      - Dual 48-core POWER8-based controllers
        - Running SMT-4 for 192 threads
      - Up to 2 TiB Cache
      - High Performance Flash Enclosure: integrates and optimizes flash technology in the DS8888F
        - Can contain up to 480 1.8" flash cards in the High-Performance Flash Enclosure (HPFE)
        - Up to 16 Flash Enclosures per System : 192 TB raw per system
- DS89#0F - released in 2020
  - IBM DS8910F - Rack-mounting (20U, 19U without KVM)
    - based on a dual IBM Power Systems S922, S914, or S924 controllers
  - IBM DS8950F
    - 42U assembled rack cabinet

== See also ==
- IBM storage
  - IBM Storwize - x86-based rackable analog, HDD-oriented (discontinued)
  - IBM XIV - x86-based cabinet-size analog, HDD-oriented (discontinued)
  - IBM FlashSystem - x86-based Flash analog
