= Extended Remote Copy =

Protocol to replicate storage volume to another site

Extended Remote Copy or XRC is an IBM zSeries and System z9 mainframe computer technology for data replication. It combines supported hardware and z/OS software to provide asynchronous replication over long distances. It is complementary to IBM's Peer to Peer Remote Copy (PPRC) service, which is designed to operate either synchronously or asynchronously over shorter distances.

XRC as a z/OS copy services solution can be compared to Global Mirror for ESS, which is a controller-based solution for either the open systems or z/Series environments. Both Global Mirror for ESS (Asynchronous PPRC) and XRC (Global Mirror for z/Series) are asynchronous replication technologies, although their implementations are somewhat different.

Extended Remote Copy or XRC is now known as Global Mirror for z/Series (XRC).

XRC is a z/Series asynchronous disk mirroring technique which is effective over any distance. It keeps the data time consistent across multiple ESS (Enterprise Storage Server) or HDS (Hitachi Data Systems) disk subsystems at the recovery site.

XRC functions as a combination of disk (IBM ESS or HDS licensed) Microcode and application code running on a z/Series host and provides a recovery point that is time consistent across multiple disk subsystems.

The host component of the software is called the System Data Mover or SDM. The SDM ensures that no dependent writes are made out of sequence and data residing on the secondary volumes will always provide a time consistent copy of the primary volumes being mirrored.

== See also ==
- Peer to Peer Remote Copy
