= Mahadev Satyanarayanan =

Indian experimental computer scientist

Mahadev Satyanarayanan (Satya)
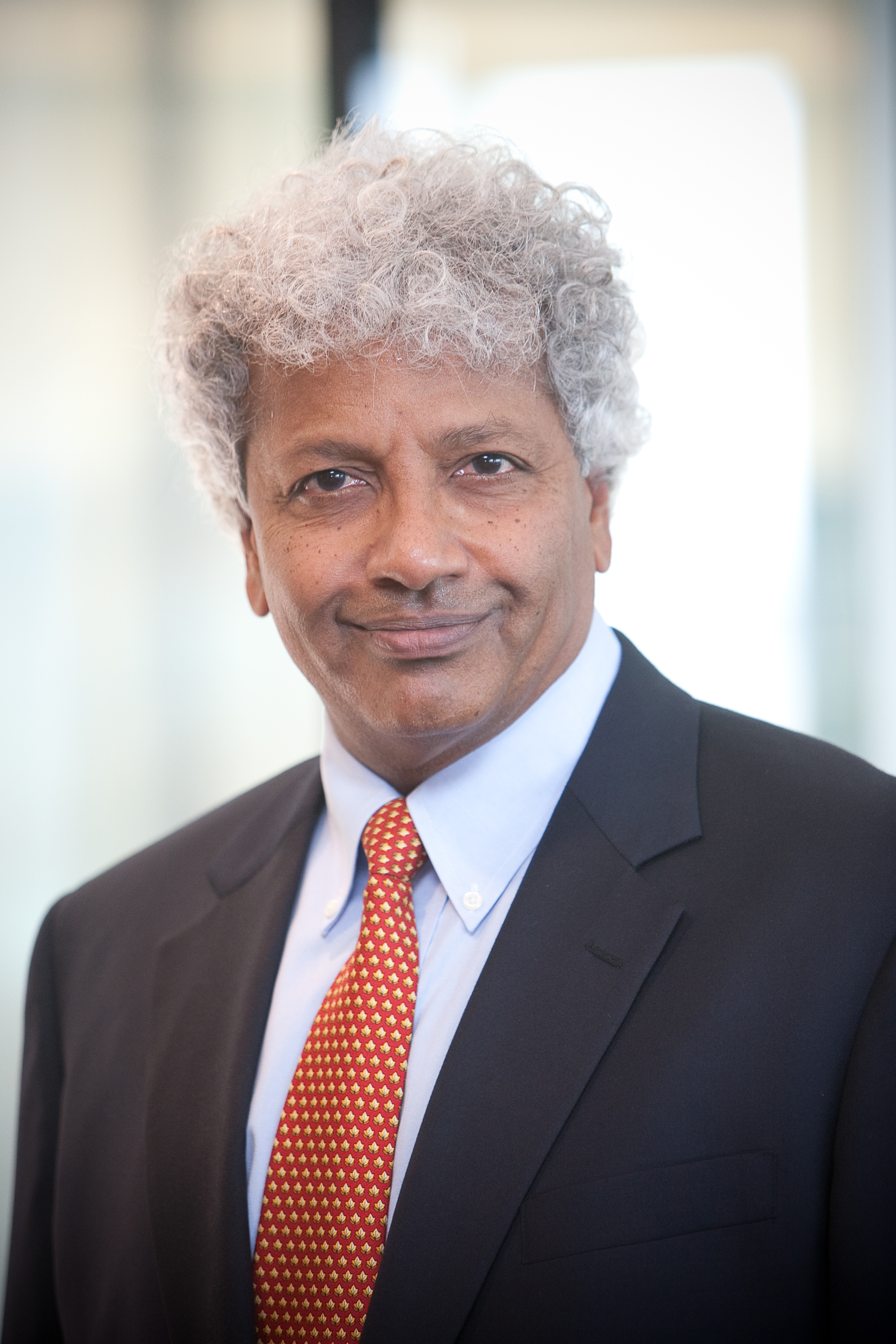
- Education: Carnegie Mellon University (Ph.D.), IIT Madras (M.Tech., B.Tech.)
- Known for: Andrew File System; Coda File System; Mobile Computing; Edge Computing; Internet of Things
- Awards: ACM Software System Award; ACM SIGOPS Hall of Fame Award (2008 and 2015); ACM SIGMOBILE Test-of-Time Award (2016, 2018, 2020, 2022, and 2024); ACM Fellow; IEEE Fellow; Member, National Academy of Engineering
- Scientific career
- Fields: Edge Computing, Mobile Computing, Internet of Things, Distributed File Systems
- Workplaces: Carnegie Mellon University
- Thesis: A methodology for modeling storage systems and its application to a network file system (1983)
- Doctoral advisor: William Wulf, George G. Robertson
- Website: https://www.cs.cmu.edu/~satya/

Mahadev Satyanarayanan is an American experimental computer scientist, an ACM and IEEE fellow, a member of the National Academy of Engineering, and the Jaime Carbonell University Professor of Computer Science at Carnegie Mellon University (CMU).

He is credited with advances in mobile computing, edge computing, Internet of Things and the distributed systems. He is known for publishing the first paper on the topic of edge computing, “The Case for VM-Based Cloudlets in Mobile Computing” in 2009. He is also known for publishing the first paper (in 1997) on offloading AI tasks such as speech recognition from resource-poor mobile devices to resource-rich infrastructure-More details on his technical contributions can be found on his web site.

In 2025, he was elected to the National Academy of Engineering.
