= FlashCopy =

IBM feature to create snapshot copies of volumes

FlashCopy is an IBM feature supported on various IBM storage devices that made it possible to create, nearly instantaneously, point-in-time snapshot copies of entire logical volumes or data sets. The Hitachi Data Systems implementation providing similar function was branded as ShadowImage. Using either implementation, the copies are immediately available for both read and write access.

== Implementations ==
=== Version 1 ===
The first implementation of FlashCopy, Version 1 allowed entire volumes to be instantaneously “copied” to another volume by using the facilities of the newer Enterprise Storage Subsystems (ESS).

Version 1 of FlashCopy had limitations however. Although the copy or “flash” of a volume occurred instantaneously, the FlashCopy commands were issued sequentially and the ESS required a brief moment to establish the new pointers. Because of this minute processing delay, the data residing on two volumes that were FlashCopied are not exactly time consistent.

=== Version 2 ===
FlashCopy Version 2 introduced the ability to flash individual data sets and then added support for “consistency groups”. FlashCopy consistency groups can be used to help create a consistent point-in-time copy across multiple volumes, and even across multiple ESSs, thus managing the consistency of dependent writes.

FlashCopy consistency groups are used in a single-site scenario in order to create a time-consistent copy of data that can then be backed-up and sent off site, or in a multi-site Global Mirror for ESS implementation to force time consistency at the remote site.

The implementation of consistency groups is not limited to FlashCopy. Global Mirror for IBM System z series (formerly known as XRC or eXtended Remote Copy) also creates consistency groups to asynchronously mirror disk data from one site to another over any distance .
