= IBM XIV Storage System =

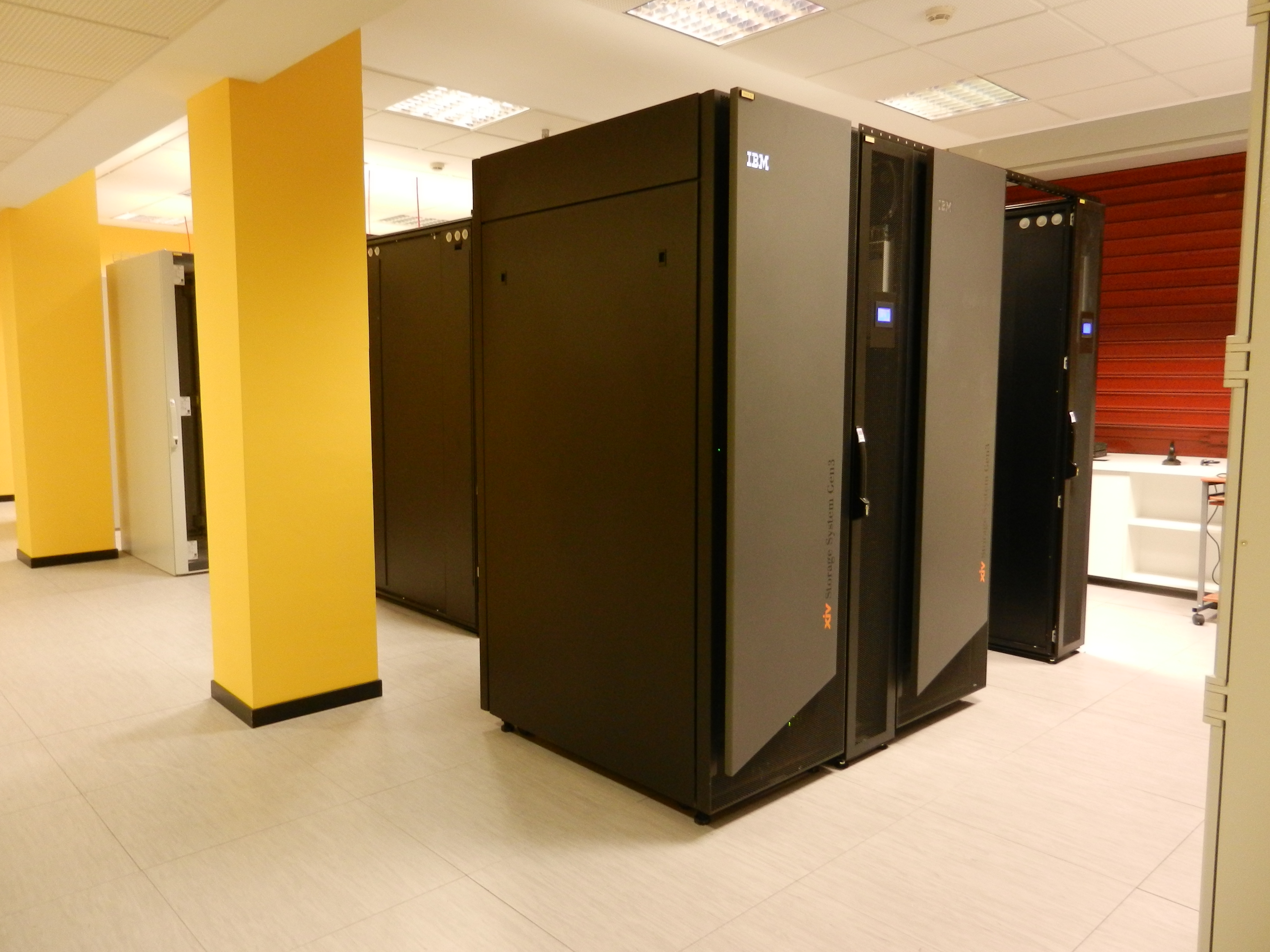
- Two IBM XIV Gen3 racks (circa 2016)
- Developer: XIV (2002-2007); IBM (2007-2018)
- Released: 2005; 21 years ago (as Nextra); 2007 (as IBM XIV Storage System)
- Discontinued: 2018
- CPU: x86 (Intel Xeon)
- Successor: IBM FlashSystem

The IBM XIV Storage System was a line of cabinet-size disk storage servers. The system is a collection of modules, each of which is an independent computer with its own memory, interconnections, disk drives, and other subcomponents, laid out in a grid and connected together in parallel using either InfiniBand (third generation systems) or Ethernet (second generation systems) connections. Each module has an x86 CPU and runs a software platform consisting largely of a modified Linux kernel and other open source software.

== Description ==
Traditional storage systems distribute a volume across a subset of disk drives in a clustered fashion. The XIV storage system distributes volumes across all modules in 1 MiB chunks (partitions) so that all of the modules' resources are used evenly. For robustness, each logical partition is stored in at least two copies on separate modules, so that if a part of a disk drive, an entire disk drive, or an entire module fails, the data is still available.

One can increase the system storage capacity by adding additional modules. When one adds a module, the system automatically redistributes previously stored data to make optimal use of its I/O capacity. Depending on the model and disk type chosen when the machine is ordered, one system can be configured for storage capacity from 27 TB to 324 TB.

The XIV software features include remote mirroring, thin provisioning, quality of service controls, LDAP authentication support, VMware support, differential, writable snapshots, online volume migration between two XIV systems and encryption protecting data at rest.

The IBM XIV management GUI is a software package that can be installed on operating systems including Microsoft Windows, Linux and Mac OS. An XIV Mobile Dashboard available for Android or iOS.

== History ==
The IBM XIV Storage System was developed in 2002 by an Israeli start-up company funded and headed by engineer and businessman Moshe Yanai. They delivered their first system to a customer in 2005. Their product was called Nextra.

In December 2007, the IBM Corporation acquired XIV, renaming the product the IBM XIV Storage System. The first IBM version of the product was launched publicly on September 8, 2008. Unofficially within IBM this product is called Generation 2 of the XIV.

The differences between Gen1 and Gen2 were not architectural, they were mainly physical. New disks were introduced, new controllers, new interconnects, improved management, additional software functions.

In September 2011, IBM announced larger disk drives, changing the inter-connectivity layer to use InfiniBand rather than Ethernet.

In 2012-2013 IBM added the support of SSD devices and 10GbE host connectivity.

== See also ==
- IBM storage
