= Tintri =

American computer storage company

Tintrí By DDN, Inc.
- Industry: Data storage devices; Information Technology; Virtualization
- Founded: 2008
- Headquarters: Santa Clara, California, United States
- Area served: Worldwide
- Key people: Phil Trickovic (SVP) Brock Mowry (CTO)
- Products: Enterprise Cloud, Workload-aware storage
- Parent: DataDirect Networks
- Website: www.tintri.com

Tintri, Inc. is a division of DataDirect Networks based in Santa Clara, California. Tintri provides products designed for businesses cloud computing, virtual machines (VMs), and containerization. The core product line is the VMstore, a storage system and software designed to simplify management in data center and cloud environments.

After becoming a public company in 2017, within a year it ran out of cash and was acquired in bankruptcy.

== History ==
Tintri was founded in 2007 by Kieran Harty, who had led development at VMware as their executive vice president of engineering from 1999 to 2006. A native of Ireland, Harty had graduate degrees from Trinity College, Dublin and Stanford University. Its initial objective was solving the mismatch between conventional storage and the demands of applications in virtual machine (VM) environments, which causes complex configuration and management as well as over-provisioning. Over time, Tintri addressed cloud needs of enterprise customers. Tintri is derived from "tintreach", the word for "lightning" in the Irish language.

Early investors included David Cheriton (Harty's Ph.D. adviser) and venture capital from New Enterprise Associates and Lightspeed Venture Partners. The first two rounds raised about $17 million before being disclosed in 2011. Another round of about $25 million was disclosed in July, 2012, with Menlo Ventures as additional investor. Pete Sonsini, (son of Silicon Valley attorney Larry Sonsini) was an early board member. In October 2013, Ken Klein, a Tintri board member and former president of Wind River Systems, became chairman and chief executive. Ian Halifax, also from Wind River, was named chief financial officer in January 2014.

A round of $75 million investment in February 2014 was led by Insight Venture Partners. In August 2015, a $125 million investment round was led by Silver Lake Kraftwerk joined by previous investors. In October, 2016, Charles Giancarlo (from Silver Lake) joined the board of directors.

On June 1, 2017, Tintri filed with the SEC for an initial public offering (IPO). The IPO was delayed and then re-priced below the original range. On June 30, 2017, its shares began trading on NASDAQ under the symbol TNTR. In December 2017 it was reported that despite the IPO, the company was looking for a buyer. In March, 2018, CEO Ken Klein was replaced by Thomas Barton.

On June 22, 2018, after failing to find a buyer and resignation of Barton as CEO, Tintri's board of directors approved a reduction in force of approximately 200 employees. The company expected to have between 40 and 50 employees left as it ran out of cash. On July 9, 2018, Tintri was delisted from NASDAQ as a result of failure to satisfy the listing requirements.

On July 10, 2018, Tintri filed for Chapter 11 Bankruptcy. DataDirect Networks (DDN) agreed to acquire substantially all of the assets of Tintri. On September 4, 2018, DDN announced it had acquired Tintri for $60 million.

== Technology ==
The Tintri VMstore uses VMs and virtual disks — in place of conventional storage abstractions — as core system management constructs. The VMstore offers a set of open interfaces for automation and orchestration in cloud environments. Tintri's architecture allows a user to set quality of service (QoS) for individual VMs, vDisks and containers, which allocates minimum or maximum performance resources according to need. The file system automatically monitors and controls IO to those VMs, vDisks and containers to eliminate conflict, often referred to as 'noisy neighbor syndrome'. And Tintri provides a global view of all the VMs stored on the VMstore, including real-time view of latency from guest VMs, vSphere hosts, the network and storage.

Tintri VMstores are accessed by clients over standard file service protocols such as the Network File System (NFS) and Server Message Block (SMB). The software runs on a customized Linux operating system.

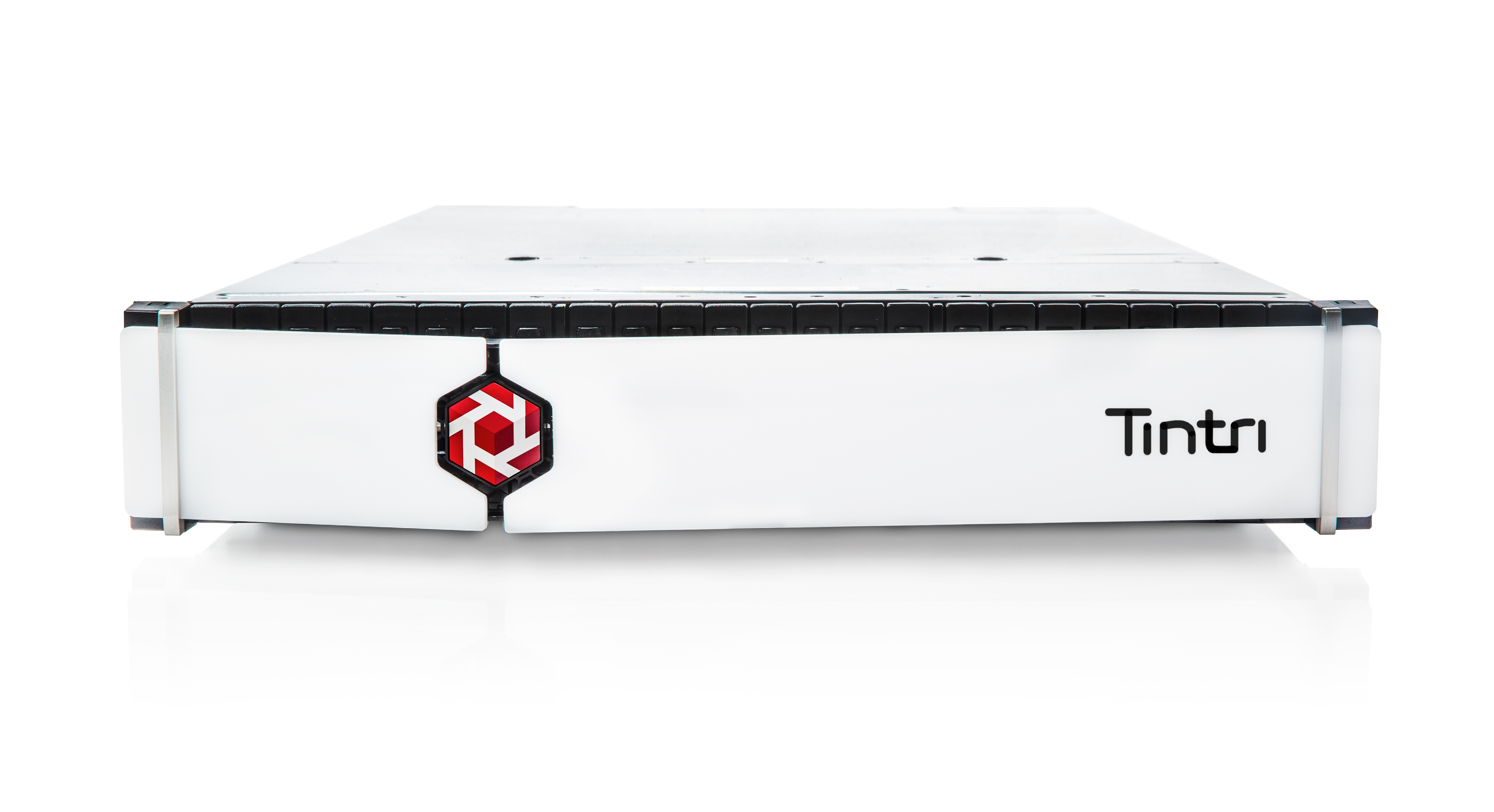
The Tintri VMstore T5000 series all-flash array

Tintri shipped its first products in April 2011. Since then, the company introduced VM-granular replication in 2013, support for VMware Virtual Volumes (VVols), VM-level automation and analytics, and other hypervisors such as Hyper-V in 2014.

On April 9, 2015, Tintri announced software that enables administrators to set maximum and minimum input/output operations per second (IOPS) to each individual VM, with visual guidance on the values to specify. On August 20, 2015, Tintri announced the VMstore T5000 series which uses only flash memory. At the same time, the VMstack product was announced using the marketing term converged infrastructure.

In May, 2016, Tintri announced capacity expansion options for the T5000 cluster computing software. In November, 2016, Tintri announced software for cloud computing. On December 13, 2018, DDN a Tintri software update.
