= DataDirect Networks =

Computer data storage company

DataDirect Networks (DDN)
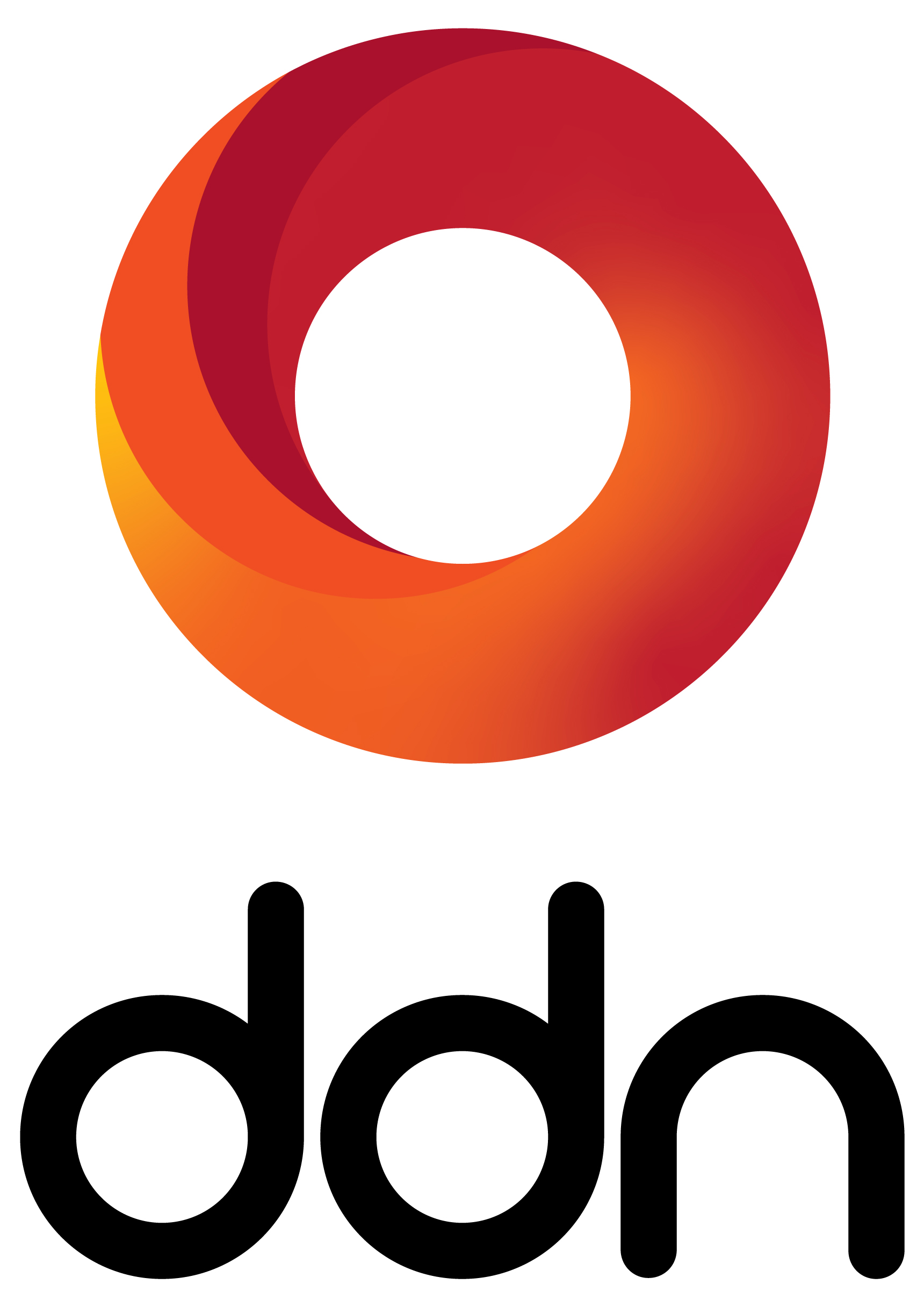
- Type: Private
- Industry: Computer data storage
- Founded: 1998
- Founder: Alex Bouzari; Paul Bloch
- Headquarters: Chatsworth, California, United States
- Key people: Alex Bouzari (Chairman, CEO); Paul Bloch (President); Ian Angelo (CFO); Sven Oehme (CTO)
- Products: Data storage hardware and software
- Number of employees: 1000 (2021)
- Website: www.ddn.com

DataDirect Networks (DDN) is a privately held data storage company, and is headquartered in Chatsworth, California, USA.

== Summary ==
DDN provides storage systems for unstructured data and big data, like AI, analytics and high performance computing (HPC) environments, in enterprise, government and academia sectors.

Although privately held, DDN announced that it had achieved annual revenue of $400 million and its highest profitability in 2020. With more than 11,000 customers and a network of resellers and distributors, DDN delivered 52 percent in revenue growth from 2018 to 2020. 2020 was also the fifth consecutive year of customer expansion, and revenue and profitability growth for DDN.

DDN provides storage for applications such as cloud storage services, supercomputing, life sciences and genomics, seismic processing, financial service trade and risk analysis, film production, live television broadcast, manufacturing, and video surveillance.

== History ==
DataDirect Networks, Inc, was formed in 1998 from the merger of two earlier companies, MegaDrive and ImpactData. Alex Bouzari is the company's CEO, chairman and co-founder. Paul Bloch is president and co-founder.

DDN concentrated on building high speed disk storage systems for customers like NASA and Nvidia, eventually delivering storage to five of their systems - Columbia, Schirra, RTJones, Hyperwall-2 and Pleiades by 2008. With the explosion of “Big Data,” Alex Bouzari and Paul Bloch realized that a wider "transformative" event was happening in IT, and that HPC-class storage would be needed for high-end analytics and data processing, with lightning-fast IO, and the ability to scale to much higher capacities. Rather than follow a larger market served by mainstream system and storage vendors, Bouzari and Bloch decided to focus exclusively on fast access and high-capacity storage, particularly for unstructured data.

DDN completed a $9.9 million round of venture capital financing in October 2001 with ClearLight Partners LLC and Digital Coast Ventures. In 2002, the company ended its relationship with its venture capital financiers. DDN created DataDirect Networks Federal, LLC, in 2005 - formalizing a team which holds the necessary clearances to support the company's focus on the U.S. government and intelligence community.

In 2008, DDN reported that it had exceeded $100 million in annual revenue and claimed to provide storage systems for 48 of the top 100 supercomputers – with customers including Argonne National Laboratory and the NASA Ames Research Center. In 2011, DDN reported that it had exceeded the $200M annual revenue mark, and was reported to be the world's largest privately held storage company, based on 2009 revenues. In 2013, the company built the storage system for Titan supercomputer. DDN announced in 2016 that it powered 70 percent of the top 500 supercomputers, up from 67 percent in 2015. In 2017, DDN earned the unicorn status.

In June 2018, DDN acquired the Lustre filesystem storage team from Intel, reviving the Whamcloud brand. In September 2018, DDN expanded further with the purchase of the virtualization focused storage company Tintri. In May, 2019, DDN acquired the software defined storage vendor Nexenta. In November 2019, DDN finalized the acquisition of the IntelliFlash division, formerly known as Tegile, from Western Digital. These last three acquisitions became the Tintri Enterprise Business Unit.

In February 2021, DDN reported revenues of $400 million and claimed 11,000 customers.

DDN operates in 20 countries with customers in over 50 countries. Following acquisitions in 2018 and 2019, the company has around 1,000 employees and has more than 150 patents. Between 2018 and 2020, DDN increased its R&D budget by 65%, with approximately two-thirds of staff in R&D and customer-facing technical roles.

== Products ==
The company carries products that provide data management, network-attached storage, block data storage, clustered file systems and object storage. Customers typically need low latency, high capacity and sustained throughput.
