= Peer to Peer Remote Copy =

Protocol to replicate storage volume to another site

Peer to Peer Remote Copy or PPRC is a protocol to replicate a storage volume to another control unit at a remote site.

Synchronous PPRC causes each write to the primary storage volume to be performed to the secondary volume as well, and the I/O is only considered complete when the update to both the primary and secondary volumes has completed. Asynchronous PPRC will flag tracks on the primary to be duplicated to the secondary when time permits.

PPRC is also the name IBM calls their implementation of the protocol for their storage hardware. Other vendors have their own implementation. For example, the HDS implementation is called TrueCopy. EMC also provides a similar capability on their VPLEX platforms called "MirrorView".

PPRC can be used to provide very fast data recovery due to failure of the primary site.

In IBM zSeries computers with two direct access storage device (DASD) control units connected through dedicated connections, PPRC is the protocol used to mirror a DASD volume in one control unit (the primary) to a DASD volume in the other control unit (the secondary).

In the IBM SAN Volume Controller PPRC is used to mirror a virtualized storage volume to remote (or the same) cluster.

PPRC is also referred to as Metro Mirror when comparing to Global Mirror.

== See also ==
- Storage replication
- Hitachi TrueCopy
- Extended Remote Copy
- Global Mirror
- Copy Services
- Norton Ghost
- EMC SRDF (Symmetrix Remote Data Facility)
- Microsoft Windows Server 2016 Storage Replica
