= Gouget (surname) =

Gouget is a French surname. Notable people with this name include:

- Aline Gouget (born 1977), French cryptographer
- Emile-Joseph-Alexandre Gouget, French sculptor with a work in La Piscine Museum
- Henri Gouget, French silent film actor
- Jean-Claude Gouget (born 1942), French politician, deputy of Lot-et-Garonne's 3rd constituency 2012–2013
- Louis Gouget (1877–1915), French lawyer and author
- Louis Gouget, French actor, in Les mutinés de l'Elseneur (1936)
- Michel Gouget, French entrepreneur, founder of Arkeia Software
- Pierre Gouget (1932–2003), French cyclist

== See also ==
- Jacques Gilles Henri Goguet
