= IntelliFlash =

Brand of flash storage arrays

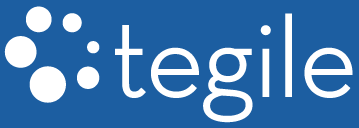
- Formerly: Tegile Systems
- Type: Brand
- Industry: Computer data storage, Hybrid array
- Founded: 2010
- Founders: Rohit Kshetrapal; Rajesh Nair
- Fate: Acquired by Western Digital in 2017 and by DataDirect Networks in 2019
- Headquarters: San Jose, California, United States
- Products: Hybrid and All-Flash storage arrays
- Parent: DataDirect Networks
- Website: www.ddn.com

IntelliFlash is a brand of DataDirect Networks (DDN) based in San Jose that manufactures flash storage arrays. The company, then known as Tegile Systems, was acquired by Western Digital in 2017 and by DDN in September 2019.

== History ==
Tegile Systems was founded in 2010 by Rohit Kshetrapal, Rajesh Nair, Justin Cheen, and Alok Agrawal. In February 2012, Tegile came out of stealth mode when it announced a product line called Zebi.

In 2013, a $32 million investment led by Meritech Capital Partners, which included a corporate venture capital investment led by Alex Lam from SanDisk Ventures. In May 2015, a round of $70 million was announced, with additional investors Capricorn Investment Group, Cross Creek Advisors and Pine River Capital Management.

By the end of 2015, Tegile had an estimated 360 employees. In 2017 Western Digital bought Tegile Systems and then rebranded it as IntelliFlash. Western Digital sold IntelliFlash to DDN in September 2019.

== Technology ==
Tegile developed what the company calls IntelliFlash Metadata Acceleration, which is a way to store metadata on high speed solid state disks, apart from the underlying data. Some competitors are noted as Nimble Storage and Tintri.
