= Western Digital My Book =

Series of external hard drives produced by Western Digital

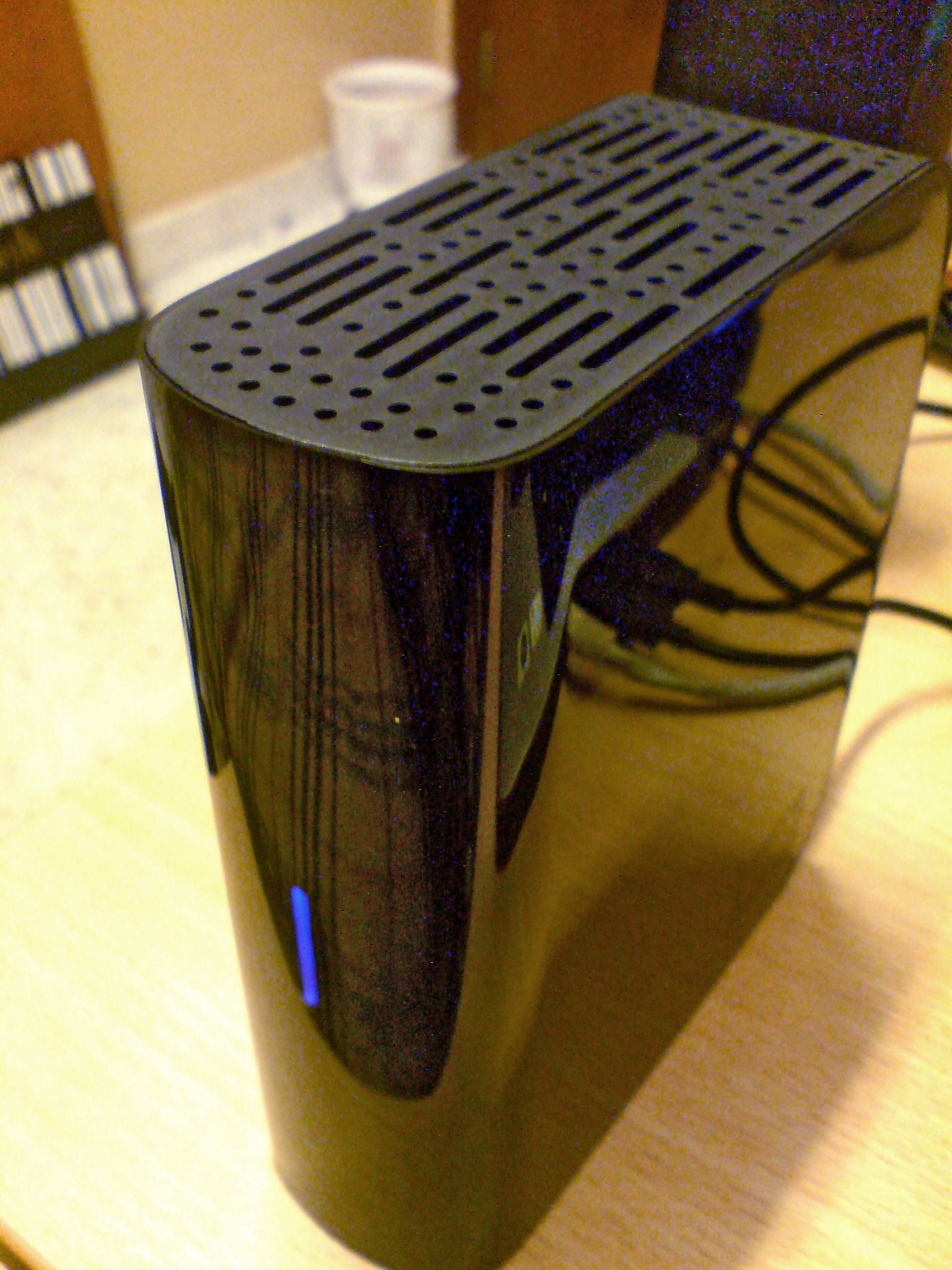
Western Digital My Book external hard drive

My Book is a series of external hard drives produced by Western Digital. There are at least nine series of My Book drives: Essential Edition, Home Edition, Office Edition, Mirror Edition, Studio Edition, Premium Edition, Elite Edition, Pro Edition, AV DVR "Live Edition", and the World Edition.

My Book drives are designed to look like a standard black hardback book, with the exception of the Pro/Studio series, which are silver, and the World series, which are white. Other than the book-like appearance of the drive's case, My Book drives originally featured vent holes on the top of the drives which spelled out a message in Morse code.

== Models ==
=== Essential Edition ===
Essential Edition My Book drives are almost entirely black, with the exception of a single blue light, used to indicate power and activity, or a circular green light that is located on the front of the drive. The older model has a white light.

"Essential Edition" drives used USB 2.0 for connectivity are available in capacities of 80 GB, 160 GB, 250 GB, 320 GB, 400 GB, 500 GB and 750 GB.

=== Premium Edition ===
Premium Edition My Book drives have the same black case as Essential Edition drives; however, the light surrounding the power button is blue. Also, inside the standard blue light is another blue ring light that contains eight individual segments which indicate the remaining space on the drive. This edition is available with storage capacities of 160 GB, 250 GB, 320 GB, 400 GB, and 750 GB.

=== Pro Edition ===
Pro Edition My Book drives have the same basic case design as Premium Edition drives; however, the case is silver rather than black. In addition, it includes a circular blue capacity gauge LED divided into six segments (representing 17% of usage per segment) and an outer ring that represents drive activity.

=== Pro Edition II ===
This edition was available with storage capacities of 500 GB, 640 GB, 1 TB, 1.5 TB, and 2 TB.

=== Premium Edition II ===
This edition is black and was available with storage capacities of 500 GB, 640 GB, 1 TB, 1.5 TB, and 2 TB.

=== World Edition ===
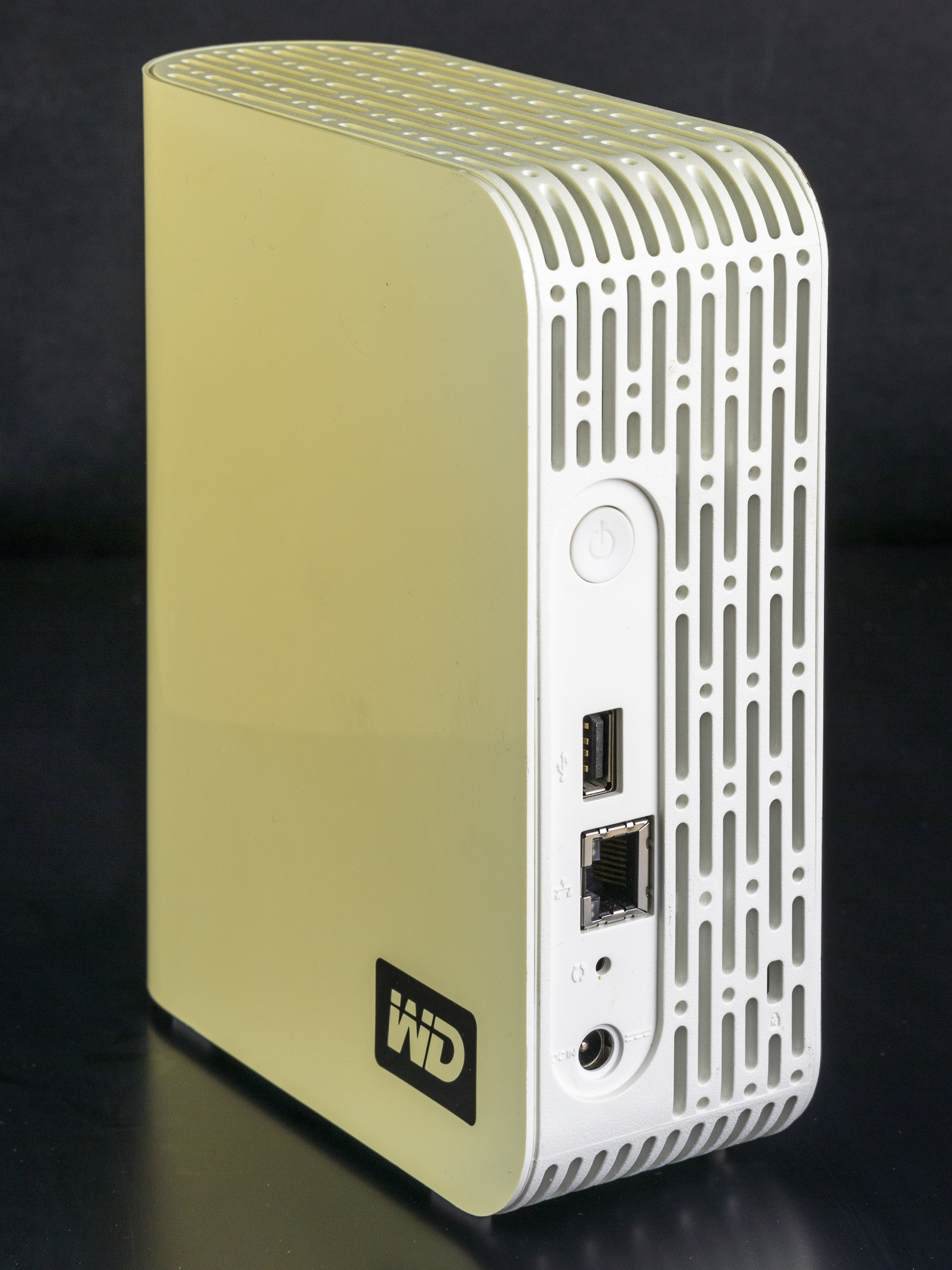
My Book World Edition (WD10000H1NC)

It has the same basic case design as the Premium Edition drives, including the capacity gauge, except the color of the World Edition is white. It has the same Morse code ventilation as the other editions.

==== Network speed ====
Although My Book Ethernet-capable disks come with a Gigabit Ethernet interface, the network speed is significantly slower. Especially for older "blue rings" models (200 MHz ARM CPU and 32 MiB RAM), where it varies between 3–6 MB/s, with an average of 4.5 MB/s. The newer "white lights" My Book World Edition 1 TB and 2 TB storage capacity models, WDH1NC and WDH2NC (oxnas810, 380 MHz ARM CPU and 128 MiB RAM), have drive speeds comparable to USB, at about 10 MB/s write and 25 MB/s read.

The "white lights" WDH1NC is jumbo frames capable and can achieve ~36 MB/s reading and ~18 MB/s writing speed over Gigabit Ethernet.

==== Internals ====
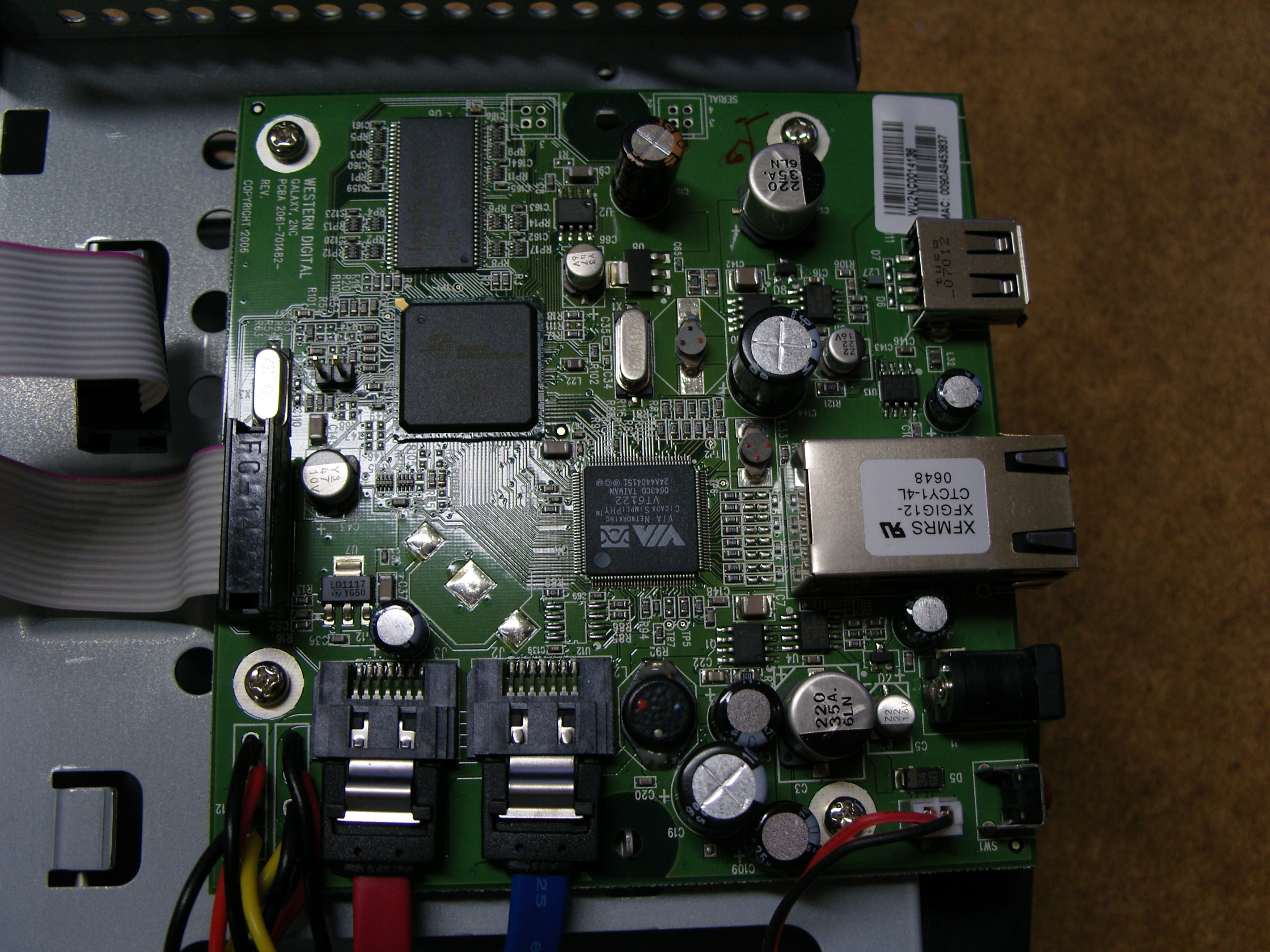
Controller board for My Book World Edition

This drive runs BusyBox on Linux on an Oxford Semiconductor 0XE800 ARM chip which has the ARM926EJ-S core. In addition it uses a VIA Cicada Simpliphy vt6122 Gigabit Ethernet chipset, and a Hynix 32 Mbit DDR Synchronous DRAM chip. The webserver is the mini_http server, although older "bluerings" use lighttpd. The drives of the World Edition are xfs or ext3 formatted, which means that the drive can be mounted as a standard drive from within Linux if removed from the casing and installed in a normal PC.

==== Extending capabilities ====
The device can be 'unlocked' and accessed via SSH terminal (newer versions of WDH1NC10000 do not need to be "unlocked": MBWE SSH Access), meaning that the WD MioNet Java-based software can be disabled so the device can be run with an unrestricted Linux OS, at the cost of voiding the warranty. The unlocking makes it possible to install other software on My Book. For example, the user can run a different web server or an ftp server (such as vsftpd) on it, use NFS for mounting shared directories natively from Unix, or install a bitTorrent client such as rTorrent.

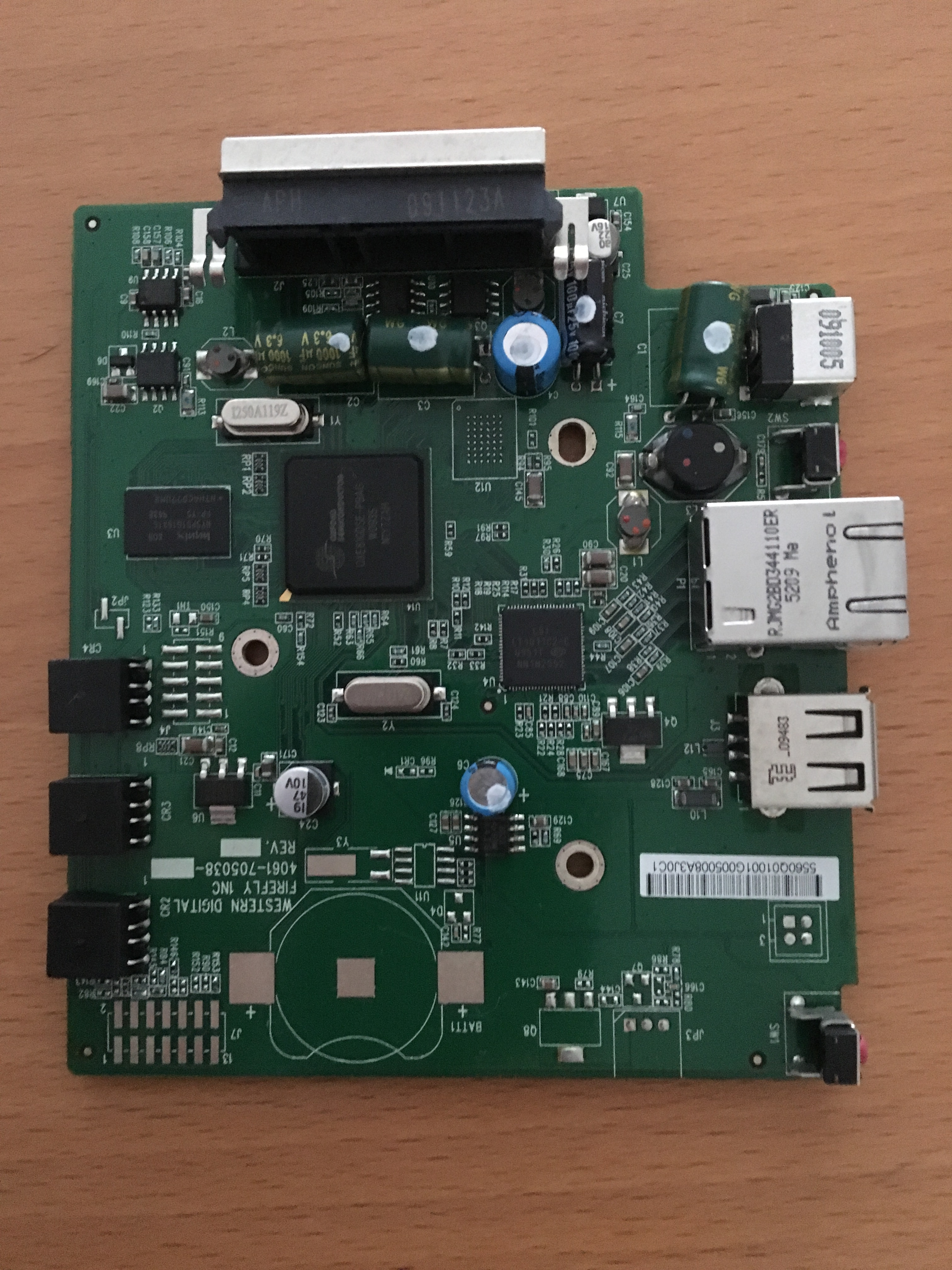
WD My Book World Edition (white light) FireFly Board

=== Premium ES Edition ===
My Book Premium ES Edition drives are nearly identical to their Premium Edition counterparts, the only difference being that the ES line features a single eSATA connection instead of the dual FireWire 400 ports present on the Premium Edition, allowing computers with available eSATA ports to transfer data at speeds of up to 3 Gbit/s. This edition is available in 320 GB and 500 GB capacities.

=== Mirror Edition ===
This edition was available with storage capacities of 1 TB and 2 TB.

=== My Book for Mac ===
This edition was available with storage capacities of 2 TB, 3 TB, 4 TB, 6 TB and 8 TB.

=== Essential ===
This edition was available with storage capacities of 500 GB, 640 GB, 1 TB, 1.5 TB, and 2 TB.

=== Studio ===
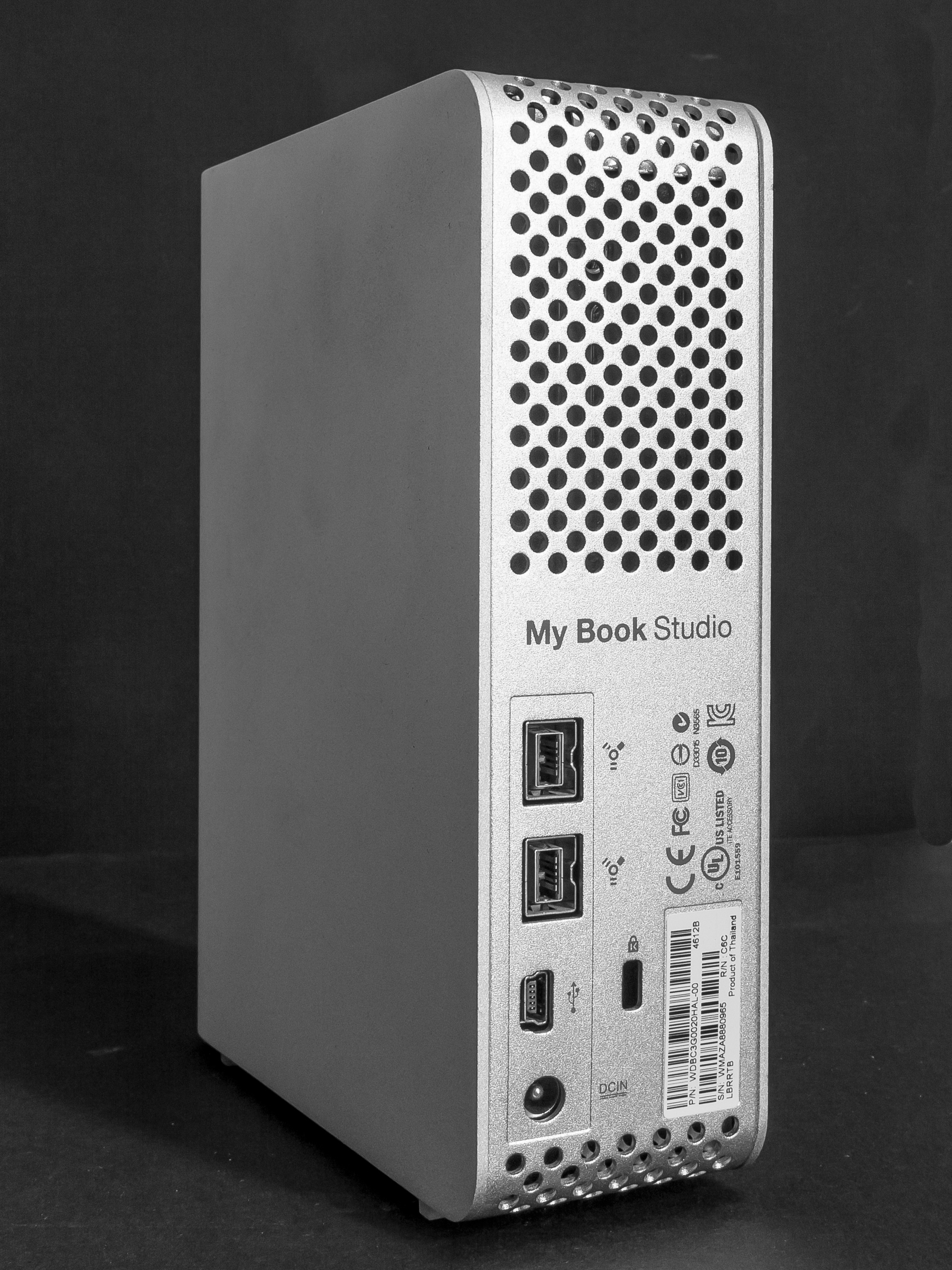
My Book Studio

The My Book Studio Edition comes with quad interface: USB 2.0 / FireWire 400 / FireWire 800 and eSATA. It is marketed for use with Mac OS X. This edition is available with storage capacities of 1 TB, 1.5 TB and 2 TB.

The current edition (as of November 2010) has two FireWire 800 ports and one USB 2.0 mini port. It comes pre-formatted as Mac OS X HFS+.

The My Book Studio Edition II contains two drives and is designed to be used as a RAID system for increased performance. This edition is available with storage capacities of 1 TB, 2 TB, 4 TB and 6 TB.

The two drives can be replaced by the user.

=== Live ===
In 2011, Western Digital released the My Book Live Edition NAS. They range in storage capacity from 1 to 3 TB. My Book Live uses Applied Micro APM82181 processor working at 800 MHz and has 256 MiB of RAM. Broadcom BCM54610 Ethernet interface is able to support 10/100/1000 Mbit/s connectivity. Contrary to previous versions, Live has no USB ports. Instead of a Linux-Kernel & Busybox found in previous versions, Live uses a full-featured Debian Linux.

=== Live Duo ===
My Book Live Duo was released in January 2012. It features two drives (totaling 6 or 4 TB, depending on the product version) that can be configured in a RAID array; in that case, all data is automatically mirrored and can be recovered if one of the drives fail (but effective drive space is halved). It sports a similar design to the previous My Book Live, but unlike that one this product has a top cover that allows for easy servicing and replacement of the drives. It also has one Gigabit Ethernet and one USB connection.

=== AV DVR Expander ===
The My Book AV DVR Expander is intended to increase the disk capacity of consumer DVRs or compatible camcorders. It can also be used connected to a computer, if necessary. The Expander is available with a storage capacity of 1 TB.

The DVR Expander was originally designed specifically for the TiVo series 3 and onwards and, at that time, the only connectivity was an eSATA port. Recent versions come with a USB 2.0 connection, as well, and are compatible with Direct TV, Dish TV, and the Pace, Time Warner and Scientific Atlanta brands of DVR.

=== My Cloud ===
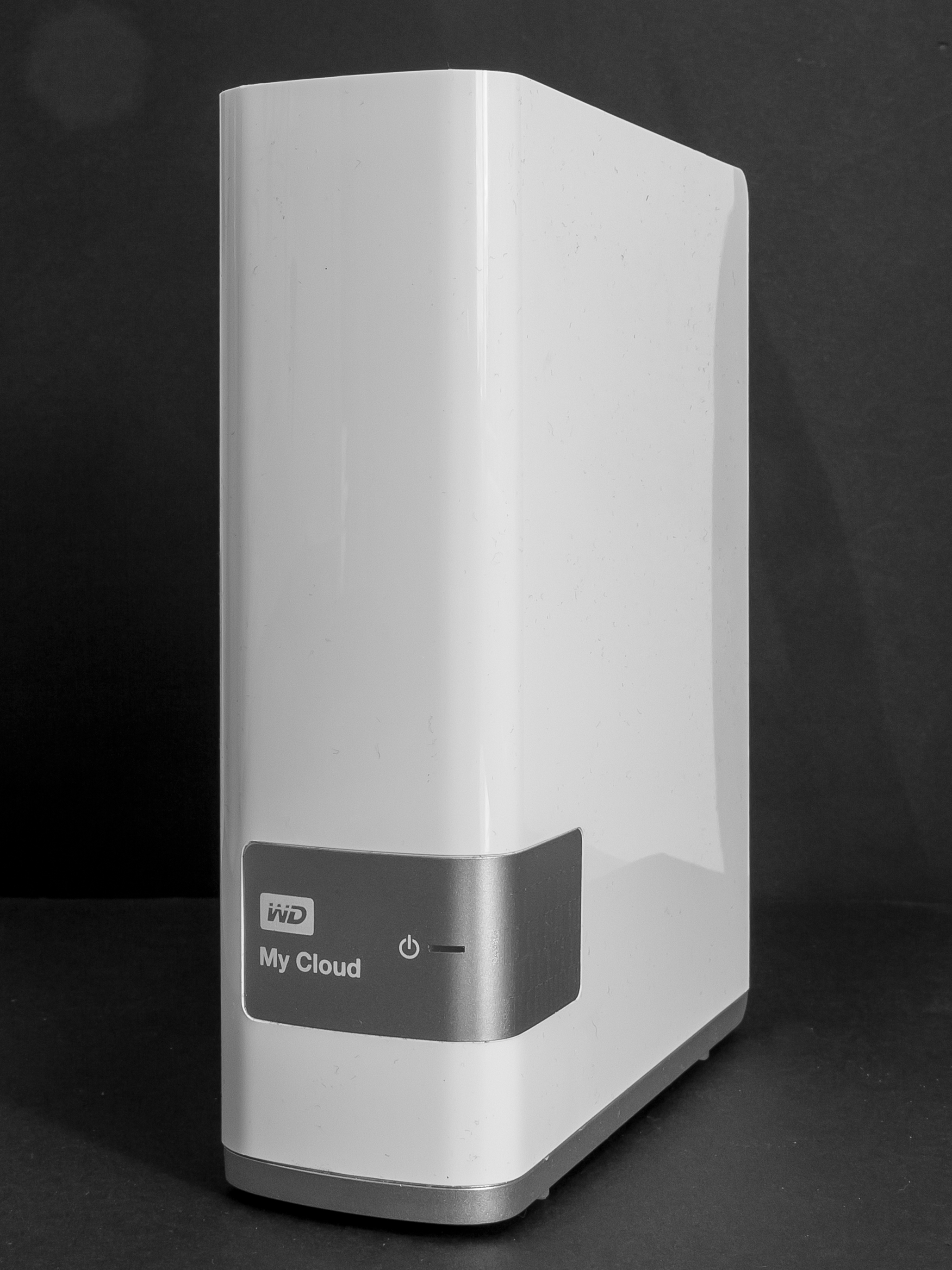
My Cloud 4 TB

In 2013, My Cloud NAS has been released by Western Digital. My Cloud uses a Mindspeed Comcerto 2000 (M86261G-12) dual-core ARM Cortex-A9 Communication Processor running at 650 MHz. The Gigabit Ethernet port is a Broadcom BCM54612E Gigabit Ethernet Transceiver. Other components include 256 MiB of Samsung K4B2G1646E DDR3 RAM and 512 KB of Winbound 25X40CL flash. The drive is a WD Red 2 TB (WD20EFRX).

== 2021 data deletion ==
On 24 June 2021, users reported that their My Book drives had apparently been wiped the day before in a factory reset, perhaps via malware.

== Morse code ==
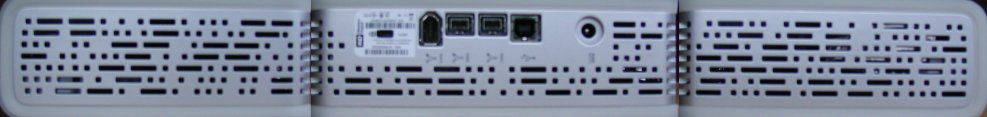
Morse code on a My Book Pro Edition drive case

The Morse code message written into the drive case is made up of a selection of the words "personal", "reliable", "innovative", "simple", and "design".
