= WD Anywhere Access =

American remote access software (2007–2016)

WD Anywhere Access (also known as WD Anywhere Access Powered by MioNet and MioNet) was a remote-access product offered by Western Digital from 2007 to 2016. MioNet was originally a product of Palo Alto–based Senvid. Western Digital purchased the assets of Senvid in 2007.

== Overview ==
The product was composed of a server and client program. The service program was preinstalled on Western Digital NAS products, such as the My Book World Edition, with three interface methods available to the user: specifically, Start, Stop, and Reset.

Upon starting, the service established a connection across the Internet with MioNet. The client program was distributed in two formats: as a Java applet and an installable program. Both client formats could connect to the server, across either a LAN or the Internet, after first connecting to MioNet. The installable client program was initially required to register and associate the NAS with a MioNet account. MioNet then facilitated all connections to the NAS service. Once connected, the client could upload or download files to the NAS.

WD Anywhere Access also offered premium subscription services, such as a remote desktop similar to VNC, and a remote PC drive similar to FTP.

== Criticism ==
According to complaints posted on many Internet discussion boards, the MioNet product had a reputation for intermittently dropping access to the network drive through the MioNet utility. Many users who did not want or need access to their files from remote locations carefully removed MioNet from their My Book World II storage network servers.

== Termination of service ==
On 26 February 2015, Western Digital notified its MioNet customers that the service would be terminated on 31 March 2016. New subscriptions would not be accepted from March 2015. Month-to-month customers would have free access during that period. No reason was cited for the termination and no flow on service was announced.
