= Virident Systems =

- Type: Subsidiary
- Industry: Solid State Storage
- Founded: 2006
- Founder: Kumar Ganapathy, Vijay Karamcheti and Raj Parekh
- Headquarters: Milpitas, California, U.S.
- Number of locations: 2
- Products: FlashMAX; tachIOn
- Number of employees: 60 (May 2011)
- Parent: Western Digital
- Website: www.virident.com

Virident Systems is a computer systems company headquartered in Milpitas, California, that designs and builds computer data storage products. The company was founded in June 2006 and initially received funding from Artiman Ventures, Accel India and Spansion Inc.

In September 2013, Western Digital announced a merger agreement where Virident will be acquired by HGST, in turn a wholly owned subsidiary of Western Digital.

== Products ==
Virident's first NAND flash based product, tachIOn, was announced in June 2010. The tachIOn products are PCIe cards that use field-replaceable modules containing single-level cell (SLC) flash components from, for example, Micron Technology, Samsung Electronics and Toshiba. They support inbuilt RAID and error correction features.

Virident Systems was chosen as a winner of TiE50 award in May 2011 and a winner of the Red Herring Top 100 North America award in June 2011.
