= Paradise Systems =

Defunct graphics hardware company

Paradise Systems, Inc.

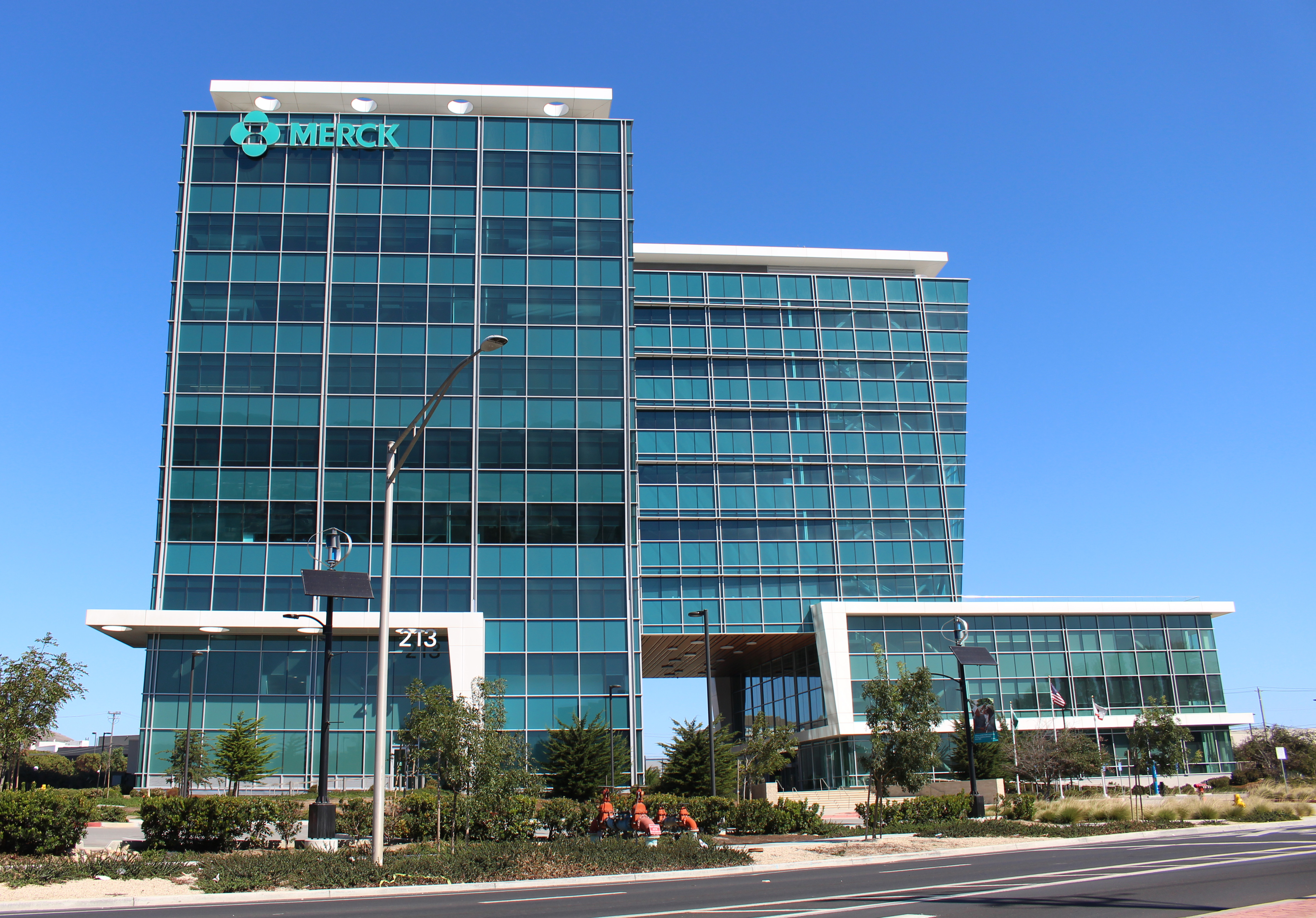
- Former headquarters in San Francisco, California; now occupied by Merck Research Laboratories
- Type: Private (1982–1986); Subsidiary (1986–1996)
- Industry: Computer
- Founded: 1982; 44 years ago in San Francisco, California
- Founder: Paul Jain
- Defunct: 1986; 40 years ago
- Fate: Acquired by Western Digital in 1986; merged with Verticom Inc. to become Western Digital Imaging; sold to Philips in 1995; dissolved in 1996
- Products: Video controllers; Graphics adapter cards
- Number of employees: 40 (1996)
- Website: paradisemmp.com at the Wayback Machine (archived 1997-12-12)

Paradise Systems, Inc., was an American video controller and graphics adapter card manufacturer active from 1982 to 1996. The company became a subsidiary of Western Digital when they purchased Paradise in 1986; in 1995, they sold the division to Philips, who subsequently folded it after less than a year.

== History ==
=== 1982–1986: Independent company ===
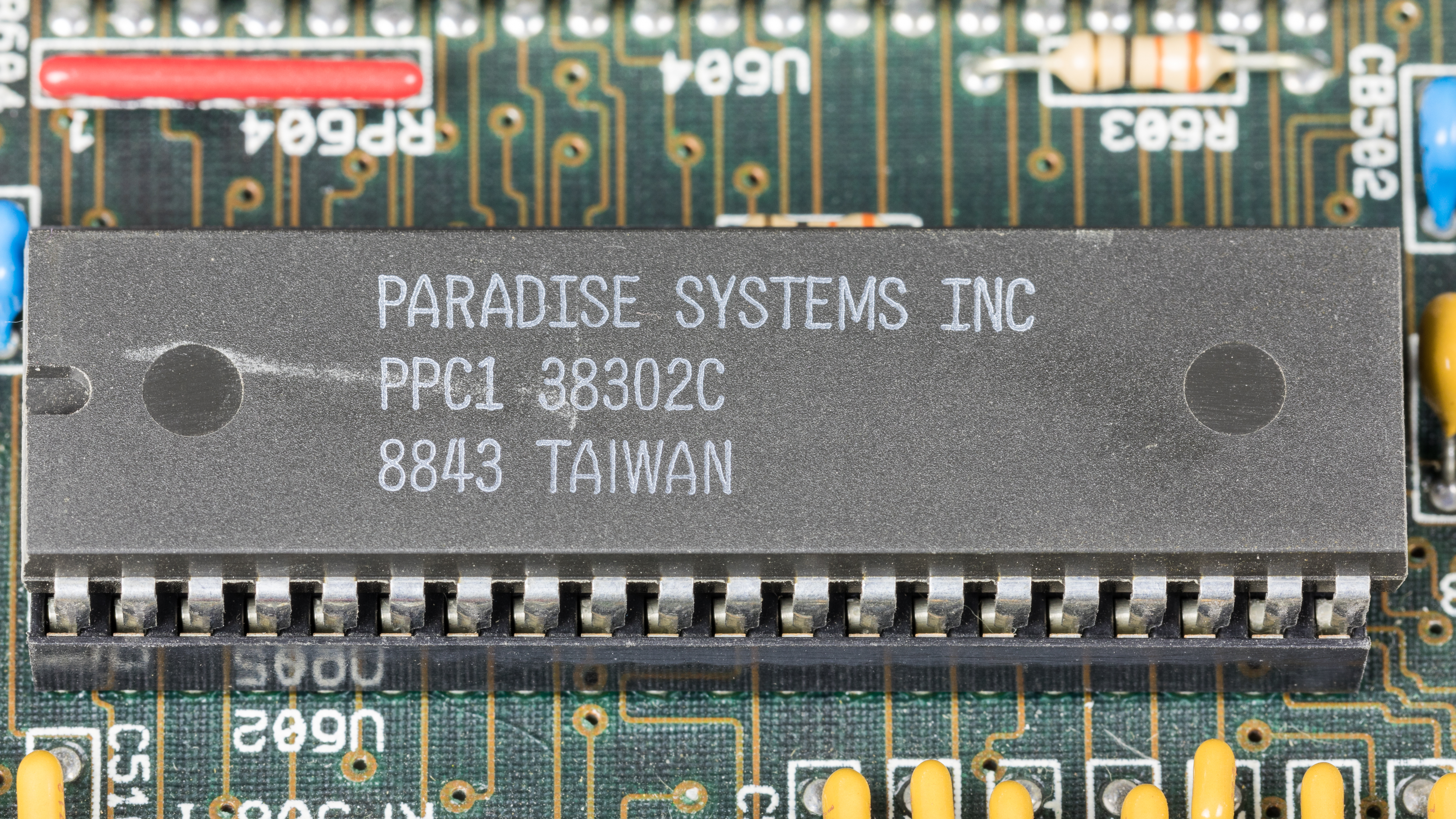
Paradise Systems PPC1 38302C on the motherboard of the Commodore PC30-III

Paradise Systems, Inc., was founded in San Francisco, California, by Paul Jain in 1982. A privately held company, Paradise was tightly knit in its first few years and had a team of seasoned electrical engineers as its base of designers.

The company's first product, the Multi-Display Adapter card for the IBM PC, was released in late 1983. Paradise's Multi-Display Adapter allowed for three video outputs to occur simultaneously—digital (TTL) CGA output, analog color composite output, and monochrome (MDA) output. Users could switch between modes and monitors using a terminate-and-stay-resident program provided by Paradise; however, users could not use the board to drive multiple monitors at once, preventing it from being a true multi-monitor system.

In 1984, Paradise delivered the Modular Graphics Card, the first successful CGA-compatible expansion card for MDA monitors. It displayed CGA's sixteen colors in shades of monochrome. Because it was hardware-compatible with CGA, the Paradise card did not need special software support or additional drivers.

Jain was succeeded as president and CEO by Lawrence Finch in April 1984.

=== 1986–1995: Western Digital subsidiary ===
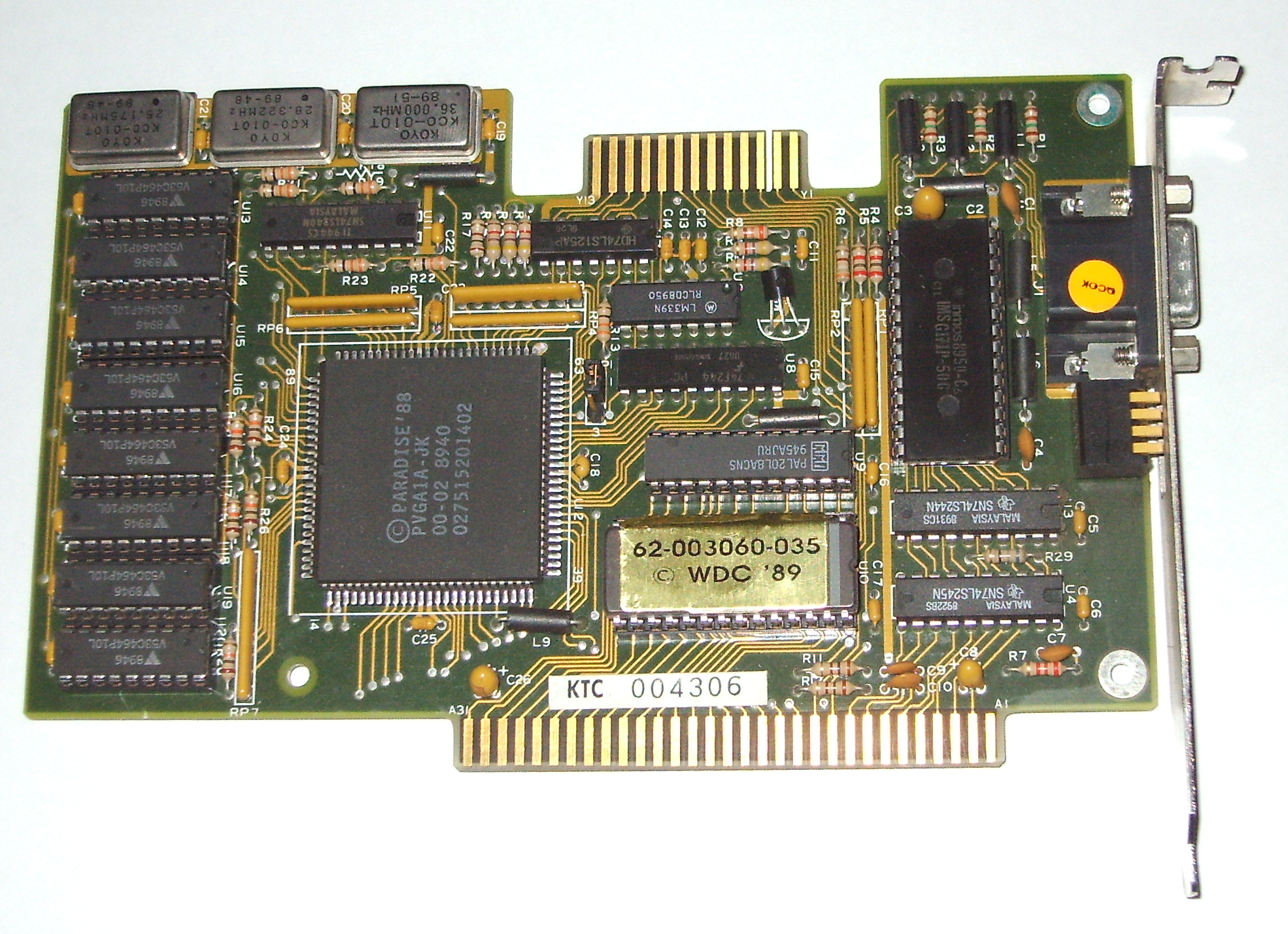
A Paradise ISA-bus VGA card from 1989

In October 1986, Western Digital, then a fast-growing manufacturer of disk controllers (yet to be a manufacturer of hard drives), announced their acquisition of Paradise Systems in a stock swap valuated at approximately $35 million. The acquisition was finalized in December 1986, the terms of the stock swap increased to either $50 million or $80 million (sources disagree) worth of Western Digital shares. Western Digital allowed Paradise to exist as an independently managed subsidiary, with Western Digital's video controllers and graphics adapters continuing to bear the Paradise name.

Jain left Paradise in February 1987 to focus on his second video controller business, Video Seven, which he founded earlier in 1985 following his replacement in Paradise by Finch. After LSI Logic acquired Video Seven for $50 million, he founded his third graphics card venture, Media Vision, in 1990.

Western Digital merged their Paradise subsidiary in around 1989 following their acquisition of Verticom Inc., another computer graphics company, in 1988. They renamed the new division Western Digital Imaging. Despite the merger, Western Digital continued selling computer graphics devices under the Paradise brand, eventually expanding into the quickly growing segment of 3D accelerator chips.

=== 1995–1996: Philips subsidiary ===
Although it generated Western Digital $100 million in sales in 1994, the division ran contrary to investors' strategic road-plan for the parent Western Digital company, and in October 1995, it was sold to Netherlands-based Philips in 1995 for an undisclosed sum. Philips subsequently christened the division Paradise. They let the division languish in the following months, however, most of Paradise's 40 employees being laid off through summer 1996. In August 1996, Philips announced that Paradise division was shuttered.
