= Faraday Electronics =

American computer company

Faraday Electronics Corporation
- Company type: Private
- Industry: Computer
- Founded: 1982; 44 years ago in Palo Alto, California, United States
- Founders: Jack Watts; Joseph Sullivan; Robert Todd; Larry Jones
- Defunct: July 1987; 38 years ago
- Fate: Acquired by Western Digital
- Products: Motherboards; Chipsets

Faraday Electronics Corporation was a private American computer company independently active from 1982 to 1987. Based in Sunnyvale, California, it was the first company to sell a motherboard compatible with the IBM Personal Computer to third parties. The company also designed its own IBM PC–compatible chipsets. Faraday's motherboards featured prominently in many IBM PC clones in the early 1980s; unlike some manufacturers, Faraday opted to sell chiefly to corporate entities rather than individuals. It was acquired by Western Digital in late 1987 and continued as a subsidiary of the latter for some years.

== History ==
Faraday Electronics was founded in 1982 in Palo Alto, California, by Jack Watts, Joseph Sullivan, Robert Todd, and Larry Jones. The co-founders were the owners of the Portola Corporation, a business management firm based in San Mateo, California. Watts, Faraday's principal founder who also had prior experience at Hewlett-Packard in their manufacturing department, left Portola in the early 1980s to join International Video Corporation as that company's vice president. Watts was named as Faraday's first CEO. In March 1983, Faraday announced the FE6400 (originally the Model 64), a motherboard that was compatible with the IBM Personal Computer. The FE6400 featured an Intel 8088 clocked at 4.77 MHz, 64 KB of RAM stock, and five ISA expansion slots. Released in late 1983, the FE6400 was the first IBM PC–compatible motherboard that was available to third parties; previous clone motherboards were pre-built into complete clone systems and were not sold separately. Faraday designed the motherboard and its BIOS chip from the ground up, while outsourcing manufacturing to Flextronics in the United States and Singapore. The FE6400 sold very well for Faraday and featured prominently in many clones in the early 1980s. By the end of 1984, the company recorded profits on sales of $3 million, an increase from $100 thousand in 1983.

In October 1983, Watts was replaced as CEO by John Lemons, who was formerly the president of Teledyne Semiconductor. Watts remained on the board of directors. Faraday's first product under Lemons' tenure was the FE6410, another IBM PC–compatible motherboard. Introduced in May 1984, the FE6410 sacrificed three expansion slots in exchange for built-in serial and parallel ports and controllers as well as built-in floppy and hard disk drive controller circuitry. Faraday followed this up with the FE620, which provided eight expansion slots—bringing it to parity with the motherboard on the IBM PC XT while providing the additional integrated parallel, serial, and disk controllers—in June 1984. In November 1984, Faraday received $6 million in funding from multiple investors including Bank of America in order to expand the company's research and development division.

In January 1985, Faraday introduced the Bus PC, a single-board implementation of an IBM PC built into a full-length ISA card that plugged into an ISA backplane. It featured integrated serial and parallel ports and supported up to 256 KB of memory. In March 1985, the company introduced the Micro PC, a miniature version of the Bus PC built into a half-height ISA card. It featured the company's first chipset, the FE2010, a single VLSI CMOS integrated circuit that consolidated many of the IBM PC's vital circuitry. It was the first use of a VLSI chipset in a PC-compatible single-board computer.

Faraday made its first and only acquisition with Selenar Corporation of Santa Clara, California, in February 1985. Faraday acquired Selenar, a manufacturer of graphical computer terminals, outright for an undisclosed sum. The company was made a subsidiary and moved closer to Faraday's base of operations in Sunnyvale. That same month, Faraday shipped the first motherboard compatible with IBM's Personal Computer AT. Called the A-Tease, it sported an Intel 80286 processor, either 640 KB or 1 MB of RAM, and integrated parallel and serial ports. By the end of 1985, Faraday reported a profit on $12 million in sales.

By the end of 1986, Faraday generated $20 million in sales and began focusing on the design and manufacture of chipsets for OEMs. In early 1987, the company introduced a four-chip VLSI implementation of the IBM PC AT's core circuitry, aiming to compete with Chips and Technologies (C&T) and their five-chip, AT-compatible CS8220 chipset. Simultaneously, Faraday began repositioning itself as a chipset vendor for manufacturers of industrial process control systems, shying away from the commodity PC motherboard segment that C&T overwhelmingly dominated.

In April 1987, Western Digital announced its intent to acquire Faraday Electronics in a stock swap. The acquisition was finalized in July 1987, Faraday's owners receiving $42 million in stock.
