= My Cloud =

Line of storage devices and servers by Western Digital Corporation

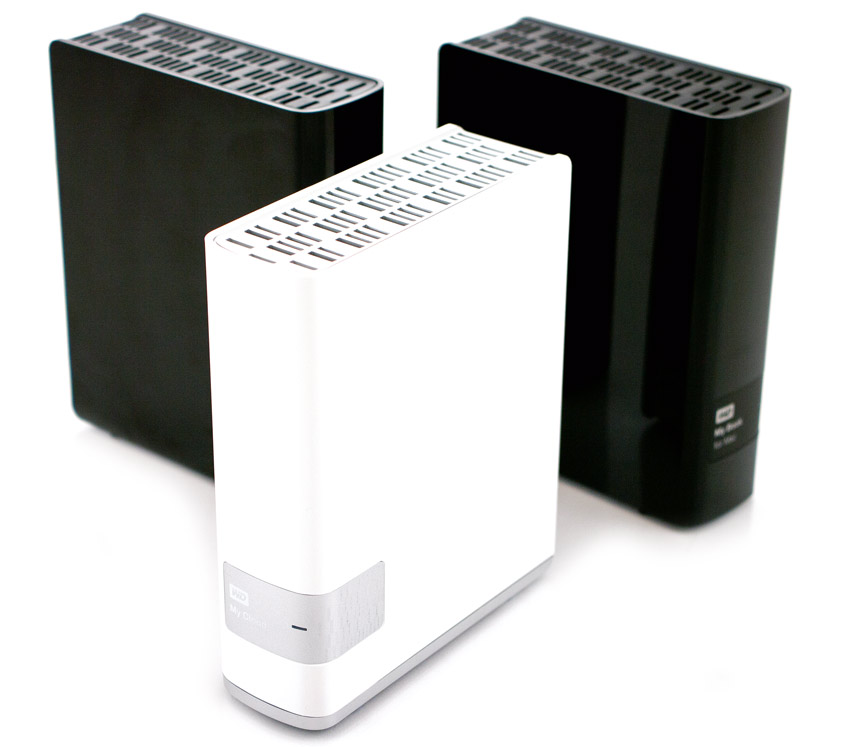
- My Cloud devices as of 2015
- Developer: Western Digital Corporation
- Type: Network-attached storage
- Related: WD My Passport; WD TV
- Website: www.mycloud.com

The My Cloud product line comprises personal network-attached storage (NAS) devices and multi-purpose servers, designed and marketed by Western Digital Corporation (WD). My Cloud devices are available in storage capacities of 2 terabytes, 3 terabytes, 4 terabytes, 8 terabytes, and 16 terabytes.

== Hardware ==
My Cloud employs a Mindspeed Comcerto 2000 dual-core ARM Cortex-A9 Communication processor running at 650 MHz. The gigabit Ethernet port is powered by a Broadcom BCM54612E Gigabit Ethernet transceiver. Additional hardware components include 256 megabytes of Samsung K4B2G1646E DDR3 random access memory and 512 kilobytes of Winbound 25X40CL flash memory. The internal storage drive utilized is a WD Red 2 terabyte hard drive. Cooling for the My Cloud system relies on fanless air convection.

My Cloud OS allows users of My Cloud NASs to control their My Cloud device. Depicted in the screenshot is the dashboard of My Cloud OS.

=== My Cloud OS and Dashboard ===
My Cloud OS, a proprietary operating system, is pre-installed on all My Cloud devices and facilitates management of the NAS's. It provides a graphical user interface and offers customization options. Moreover, some users have identified that the operating system is based on Linux, sporting a user-friendly graphical user interface and SSH accessibility.

This operating system is proprietary. However, others have found the operating system to be Linux, with a graphical user interface, but also accessible. It comes pre-installed on all My Cloud devices.

== Compatibility and Applications ==
=== My Cloud apps ===
My Cloud is designed to be compatible with various platforms, including personal computers, Apple Macs, Android devices, and iOS devices. Western Digital provides applications that enable interaction with My Cloud devices.

== Incidents ==
On March 26, 2023, Western Digital encountered a cyberattack that led to unauthorized access to company systems and data theft. As a precautionary measure, the company temporarily suspended some services, including My Cloud on April 2. The suspension lasted for ten days, during which users were unable to remotely access files stored on their WD NAS devices. After the security assessment was completed, My Cloud functionality was restored.
