= Arkeia Software =

American computer software company

- Type: Private
- Industry: Computer software
- Founded: 1996; 30 years ago
- Headquarters: Carlsbad, California, United States
- Key people: Bill Evans, (CEO)
- Products: Arkeia Network Backup, Arkeia Backup Appliance
- Revenue: Private
- Number of employees: 50
- Website: arkeia.com

Arkeia Software (/ɑːrˈkiːə/ ar-KEE-ə) is an American computer software company. It produces network backup software for 200 platforms including Windows, Macintosh, Linux, AIX, BSD and HP-UX, and also a backup appliance, integrating its software with disk storage and network connectivity. In January 2013, Western Digital Corporation announced it had acquired Arkeia Software. In May 2015, a community representative for WDC posted on their forum, indicating that the Arkeia Network Backup product line was being phased out.

== History ==
Originally named Knox Software, the company was founded in 1996 in France by Michel Gouget, along with Michel Colzi, Nordine Kherif, and Arnaud Spicht together with Marketing Exec Phillippe Roussel. First incorporated in San Jose, California, the company was reincorporated in France after a $4 million Series-A investment in 2004 from SPEF Ventures (Banque Populaire) and Crédit Agricole Private Equity; this was followed by a $3 million Series-B investment by the same investors in 2007.

== Products ==
=== Backup software ===
The firm's backup software has been released in several successive products. Its earlier product, Smart Backup (available 2005—2007) was reviewed in Linux User and Developer

Its current backup product, Arkeia Network Backup software, was reviewed in various releases in Linux Magazine, and Linux Format.

In 2009 the company released the product as a system image for VMware virtual machines. In 2009 the company acquired intellectual property and engineering resources from Kadena Systems in a deal that added source-based data deduplication to the software. The technology uses a sliding window approach to identify duplicate data which checks the data stream one byte at a time until it finds blocks that match what the application has seen before. The current version, 9.0, automatically adjusts block sizes based on file type in order to maximize dedupe ratios.

Licenses for the company's products have generally been "for fee" licenses, but beginning in 1998, it has made available a limited-capability free version. The first version, Arkeia Light, was available from 1998 to 2003. The current free version, called Arkeia Network Backup Free Use Edition, is available for download on the company’s website.

In addition, an Ubuntu 8.04 LTS repository was released as a no-cost, small-network package in 2009.

=== Appliances ===
The firm's backup appliance, originally called EdgeFort and now Arkeia Backup Appliance, was released in 2007, and has also had several versions. It allows backup administrators to remotely manage backup operations at remote sites without sending data back to headquarters over the WAN. It was reviewed by Storage Magazine in 2008, in its 2008 review of the EdgeFort 100 appliance.
