= My Passport =

Series of portable external hard drives

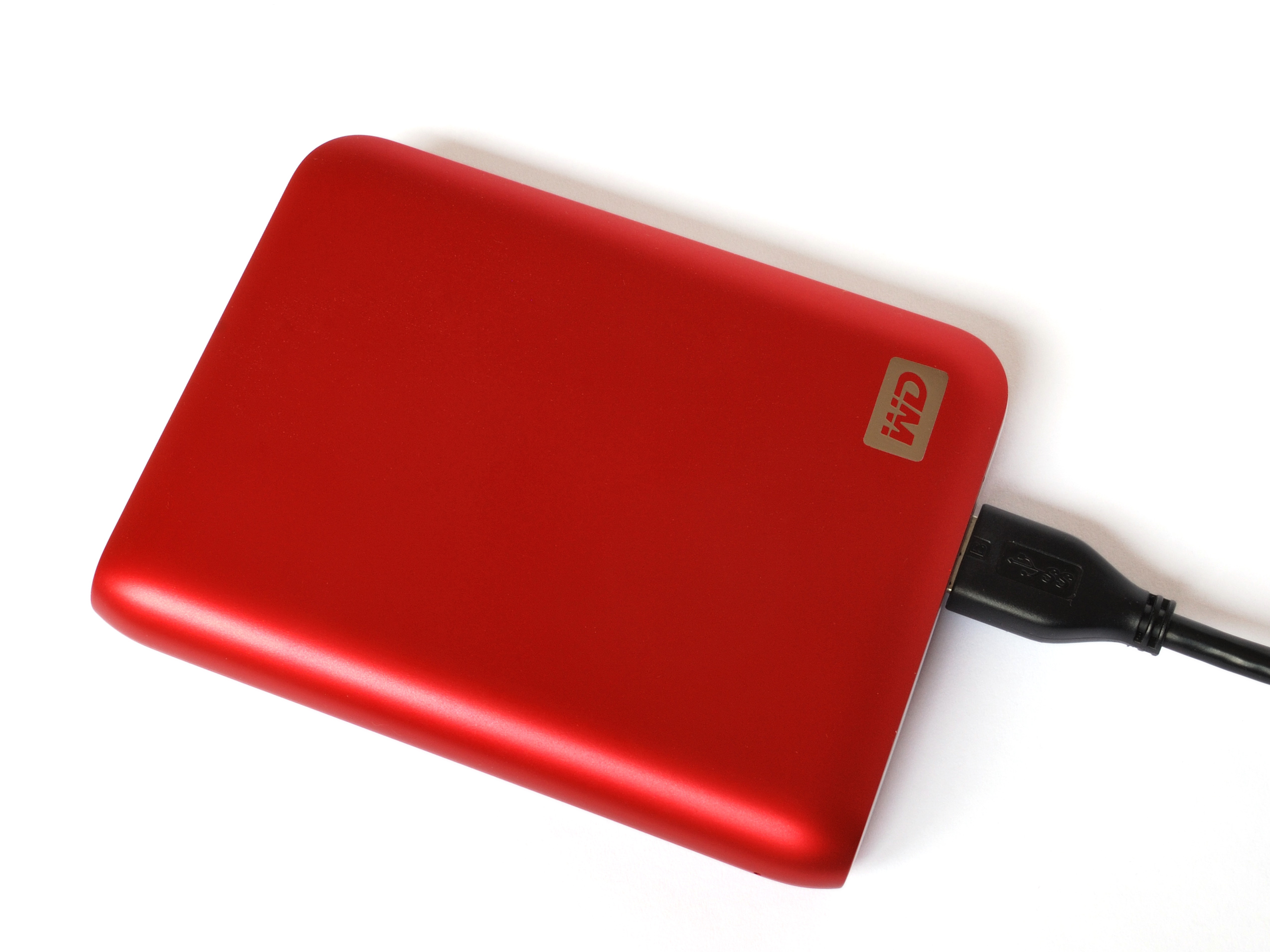
A My Passport Essential SE Edition External Hard Drive with 1 TB capacity

My Passport is a series of portable external hard drives and solid state drives launched in 2004 and produced by Western Digital. There are currently six series of My Passport drives; Essential Edition, Essential SE Edition, Elite Edition, Essential for Mac, Studio Edition and the Essential SE for Mac.

Drives in the series are designed to look like and be the size of a passport. None of them require a power socket although the "elite editions" feature a docking system.

== Standard editions ==
=== Essential Edition ===
Essential Editions include USB 2.0 though new models also include USB 3.0 ports, the white LED Indicator.

=== Essential SE Edition ===
Essential SE Editions have both USB 2.0 and USB 3.0 ports and come in 750 GB and 1 TB variations; the Essential SE Edition has the same physical appearance as the Essential Edition.

=== Elite Edition ===
Elite Editions have a USB 2.0 port and come in 320 GB (298 GiB), 500 GB (466 GiB)and 640 GB (596 GiB) variations. Elite Editions include a desktop dock and have a LED capacity gauge on the front and a lock indicator. This edition comes in red, blue and black.

== Mac editions ==
=== Essential Edition ===
The Essential Edition for MacBook Pro and Air has a USB 2.0 port and a capacity of 320 GB (298 GiB) and is available in gloss black. It has the same design as the Essential Edition.

=== Essential SE Edition ===
The Essential SE Edition for Mac has a USB 2.0 port and a capacity of 1 TB and comes in silver. It has the same design as the Essential Edition.

=== Studio Edition ===
The Studio Edition has FireWire 400, FireWire 800 and USB 2.0 ports and a capacity of 320 GB (298 GiB), 640 GB (596 GiB), 1 TB and 2 TB. The older versions (smaller capacity) of the Studio Edition with the book-like design are silver and have a capacity gauge on the top side (which slides to reveal the ports) and have only one Firewire port. The newer version (bigger capacity) with rounded design of the enclosure has either silver or black appearance and has two Firewire ports. The enclosure is all metal (alluminium).

== Console editions ==
=== My Passport X Edition ===
The My Passport X editions include a USB 3.0 port and come in 1TB and 2TB variations. This specific edition has been marketed as a hard drive designed to extend the storage capacity of consoles such as the Xbox and PlayStation.
