= Pine River Capital Management =

Pine River Capital Management L.P.
- Company type: Private company
- Industry: Financial services
- Founded: 2002; 24 years ago
- Founder: Brian Taylor (CEO and CIO)
- Headquarters: Minnetonka, MN, United States
- Number of locations: Two additional offices in New York City and London
- Products: Investment Management; Asset Management
- Website: www.pinerivercapital.com

Pine River Capital Management is an American asset management firm based in Minnetonka, MN. The firm traded its investors funds using stocks, fixed income, derivatives and warrants.

As of 2018, the company managed approximately US$7 billion across three actively managed platforms: hedge funds, managed accounts and listed investment vehicles to support a number of strategies including interest rates, mortgages, equity long/short, event-driven equity, and global convertible bond arbitrage. The company is managed by founder and CEO Brian Taylor and 6 partners.

== History ==
Brian Taylor founded Pine River in 2002 to pursue opportunities in global relative value trading with an initial investment of $5.3 million. The firm was initially located in Pine River, Minnesota, before moving to Minneapolis, Minnesota in 2003. In 2007, Pine River relocated to Minnetonka. Pine River's various portfolio management teams take a relative value approach to investing, seeking to identify dislocations between prices of related financial instruments and markets.

Pine River Capital Management L.P. became registered as an investment advisor with the US Securities and Futures Commission in January 2006. Pine River Capital Management (UK) Limited became authorized by the British Financial Services Authority to manage investments in the UK in January 2004.

Between October 2009 and August 2020, a subsidiary of Pine River was the external investment manager of Two Harbors Investment Corp. (NYSE: TWO), a publicly listed real estate investment trust that invests in mortgage-backed securities and related instruments.

Between June 2017 and December 2020, Pine River was the external manager of Granite Point Mortgage Trust (NYSE: GPMT), a publicly listed real estate investment trust that focused on directly originating, investing in, and managing senior floating-rate commercial mortgage loans and other debt and debt-like commercial real estate investments.

In 2017, following a wave of withdrawals, Pine River closed one of its master funds. Between 2015 and 2018 its assets declined from US$15 billion to US$7 billion.
