= Compute Express Link =

Open standard processor interconnection for data centers

- Year created: 2019; 7 years ago
- Created by: Intel
- No. of devices: 4096
- Speed: Full duplex: 1.x-2.0 (32 GT/s): 3.938 GB/s (×1); 63.015 GB/s (×16); 3.x (64 GT/s): 7.563 GB/s (×1); 121.0 GB/s (×16); 4.0 (128 GT/s): 15.126 GB/s (×1); 242.0 GB/s (×16)
- Style: Serial
- Website: www.computeexpresslink.org

Compute Express Link (CXL) is an open standard interconnect for high-speed, high capacity CPU-to-device and CPU-to-memory connections, designed for high performance data center computers. CXL is built on the serial PCI Express (PCIe) physical and electrical interface and includes PCIe-based block input/output protocol (CXL.io) and new cache-coherent protocols for accessing system memory (CXL.cache) and device memory (CXL.mem). The serial communication and pooling capabilities allows CXL memory to overcome performance and socket packaging limitations of common DIMM memory when implementing high storage capacities.

== History ==
The CXL technology was primarily developed by Intel. The CXL Consortium was formed in March 2019 by founding members Alibaba Group, Cisco Systems, Dell EMC, Meta, Google, Hewlett Packard Enterprise (HPE), Huawei, Intel Corporation and Microsoft, and officially incorporated in September 2019. As of January 2022, AMD, Nvidia, Samsung Electronics and Xilinx joined the founders on the board of directors, while ARM, Broadcom, Ericsson, IBM, Keysight, Kioxia, Marvell Technology, Mellanox, Microchip Technology, Micron, Oracle Corporation, Qualcomm, Rambus, Renesas, Seagate, SK Hynix, Synopsys, and Western Digital, among others, were contributing members. Industry partners include the PCI-SIG, Gen-Z, SNIA, and DMTF.

On April 2, 2020, the Compute Express Link and Gen-Z Consortiums announced plans to implement interoperability between the two technologies, with initial results presented in January 2021. On November 10, 2021, Gen-Z specifications and assets were transferred to CXL, to focus on developing a single industry standard. At the time of this announcement, 70% of Gen-Z members already joined the CXL Consortium.

On August 1, 2022, OpenCAPI specifications and assets were transferred to the CXL Consortium, which now includes companies behind memory coherent interconnect technologies such as OpenCAPI (IBM), Gen-Z (HPE), and CCIX (Xilinx) open standards, and proprietary InfiniBand / RoCE (Mellanox), Infinity Fabric (AMD), Omni-Path and QuickPath/Ultra Path (Intel), and NVLink/NVSwitch (Nvidia) protocols.

=== Specifications ===
On March 11, 2019, the CXL Specification 1.0 based on PCIe 5.0 was released. It allows host CPU to access shared memory on accelerator devices with a cache coherent protocol. The CXL Specification 1.1 was released in June, 2019.

On November 10, 2020, the CXL Specification 2.0 was released. The new version adds support for CXL switching, to allow connecting multiple CXL 1.x and 2.0 devices to a CXL 2.0 host processor, and/or pooling each device to multiple host processors, in distributed shared memory and disaggregated storage configurations; it also implements device integrity and data encryption. There is no bandwidth increase from CXL 1.x, because CXL 2.0 still utilizes PCIe 5.0 PHY.

On August 2, 2022, the CXL Specification 3.0 was released, based on PCIe 6.0 physical interface and PAM-4 coding with double the bandwidth; new features include fabrics capabilities with multi-level switching and multiple device types per port, and enhanced coherency with peer-to-peer DMA and memory sharing.

On November 14, 2023, the CXL Specification 3.1 was released.

On December 3, 2024, the CXL Specification 3.2 was released. CXL 3.2 introduced the CXL Hot-Page Monitoring Unit (CHMU), which allows software to identify frequently accessed pages in tiered memory systems. It also added common event records, PCIe management message pass-through compatibility, and online firmware activation.

On November 18, 2025, the CXL Specification 4.0 was released, doubling the link rate from 64 to 128 GT/s. It also introduced bundled ports and enhanced memory reliability, availability, and serviceability features.

=== Implementations ===
On April 2, 2019, Intel announced their family of Agilex FPGAs featuring CXL.

On May 11, 2021, Samsung announced a 128 GB DDR5 based memory expansion module that allows for terabyte level memory expansion along with high performance for use in data centres and potentially next generation PCs. An updated 512 GB version based on a proprietary memory controller was released on May 10, 2022.

In 2021, CXL 1.1 support was announced for Intel Sapphire Rapids processors and AMD Zen 4 EPYC "Genoa" and "Bergamo" processors.

CXL devices were shown at the ACM/IEEE Supercomputing Conference (SC21) by vendors including Intel, Astera, Rambus, Synopsys, Samsung, and Teledyne LeCroy.

== Protocols ==
The CXL transaction layer is composed of three dynamically multiplexed (they change according to demand) sub-protocols on a single link:

- CXL.io – based on PCIe 5.0 (and PCIe 6.0 after CXL 3.0) with a few enhancements, it provides configuration, link initialization and management, device discovery and enumeration, interrupts, DMA, and register I/O access using non-coherent loads/stores.
- CXL.cache – defines interactions between a host and a device, allows peripheral devices to coherently access and cache host CPU memory with a low latency request/response interface.
- CXL.mem – allows host CPU to coherently access device-attached memory with load/store commands for both volatile (RAM) and persistent non-volatile (flash memory) storage.

CXL.cache and CXL.mem protocols operate with a common link/transaction layer, which is separate from the CXL.io protocol link and transaction layer. CXL.cache and CXL.mem transmit relevant data faster than CXL.io through the use of a 68B fixed width Flow Control Unit (FLIT) over standard PCIe 5.0 PHY. 2 of the 68 bytes are used by an Arbitration and Multiplexing (ARB/MUX) block to multiplex between the cache, mem, and IO sub-protocols. The remaining 66B consists of four 16B data 'slots' and a 2B cyclic redundancy check (CRC) value. CXL FLITs encapsulate PCIe standard Transaction Layer Packet (TLP) and Data Link Layer Packet (DLLP) data with a fixed frame size format.

CXL 3.0 introduces 256-byte FLIT in PAM-4 transfer mode. Flits come in two variations:

- Standard: Bytes 0-1, 242-249, and 250-255 are used by the Physical Layer as a 2B flit header (HDR), a 8B CRC, and a forward error correction (FEC) code in that order. This leaves 240 bytes for actual data.
- Latency Optimized (LOpt): Split into two 128B halves, whereby the happy path (CRC matches) reduces latency by ~5ns over the standard flit. PHY reserved bytes are: 0-1 as 2B HDR, 122-127 as 6B CRC for bytes 0-127, 244-249 as 6B FEC for all 256 bytes, and 250-255 as 6B for bytes 128-255. This leaves 236 bytes for actual data.

== Device types ==
CXL is designed to support three primary device types:

- Type 1 (CXL.io and CXL.cache) – coherently access host memory, specialized accelerators (such as smart NIC, PGAS NIC, and NIC Atomics) with no local memory. Devices rely on coherent access to host CPU memory.
- Type 2 (CXL.io, CXL.cache and CXL.mem) – coherently access host memory and device memory, general-purpose accelerators (GPU, ASIC or FPGA) with high-performance GDDR or HBM local memory. Devices can coherently access host CPU's memory and/or provide coherent or non-coherent access to device local memory from the host CPU.
- Type 3 (CXL.io and CXL.mem) – allow the host to access and manage attached device memory, memory expansion boards and persistent memory. Devices provide host CPU with low-latency access to local DRAM or byte-addressable non-volatile storage.

Type 2 devices implement two memory coherence modes, managed by device driver. In device bias mode, device directly accesses local memory, and no caching is performed by the CPU; in host bias mode, the host CPU's cache controller handles all access to device memory. Coherence mode can be set individually for each 4 KB page, stored in a translation table in local memory of Type 2 devices. Unlike other CPU-to-CPU memory coherency protocols, this arrangement only requires the host CPU memory controller to implement the cache agent; such asymmetric approach reduces implementation complexity and reduces latency.

CXL 2.0 added support for switching in tree-based device fabrics, allowing PCIe, CXL 1.1 and CXL 2.0 devices to form virtual hierarchies of single- and multi-logic devices that can be managed by multiple hosts.

CXL 3.0 replaced bias modes with enhanced coherency semantics, allowing Type 2 and Type 3 devices to back invalidate the data in the host cache when the device has made a change to the local memory. Enhanced coherency also helps implement peer-to-peer transfers within a virtual hierarchy of devices in the same coherency domain. It also supports memory sharing of the same memory segment between multiple devices, as opposed to memory pooling where each device was assigned a separate segment.

CXL 3.0 allows multiple Type 1 and Type 2 devices per each CXL root port; it also adds multi-level switching, helping implement device fabrics with non-tree topologies like mesh, ring, or spline/leaf. Each node can be a host or a device of any type. Type 3 devices can implement Global Fabric Attached Memory (GFAM) mode, which connects a memory device to a switch node without requiring direct host connection. Devices and hosts use Port Based Routing (PBR) addressing mechanism that supports up to 4,096 nodes.

== Devices ==
In May 2022 the first 512 GB devices became available with 4 times more storage than previous devices.

== OS support ==
- Windows Server 2022 added native support for CXL memory devices.
- Linux kernel 6.5 added support for CXL.

== Latency ==
CXL memory controllers typically add about 200 ns of latency.

== See also ==
- Coherent Accelerator Processor Interface (CAPI)
- Universal Chiplet Interconnect express (UCIe)
- Data processing unit (DPU)
