= IPT =

IPT may refer to:

== Medicine ==
- Insulin potentiation therapy, an unproven alternative cancer treatment
- Intermittent preventive therapy, a public health intervention
- Interpersonal psychotherapy

== Organizations ==
- Department of Petroleum Engineering and Applied Geophysics, NTNU
- Idaho Public Television
- Illini Prosthetic Technologies, in Illinois
- Indecent Publications Tribunal, a former government censorship organisation in New Zealand
- Indian People's Tribunal, a human rights organization
- Industry and Parliament Trust
- International Physicists' Tournament, a physics competition for university students
- Invercargill Passenger Transport, a bus company in New Zealand
- Investigative Project on Terrorism
- Investigatory Powers Tribunal, a UK judicial body which investigates complaints about state surveillance
- IPtronics, a semiconductor company
- Instituto de Pesquisas Tecnológicas, a Brazilian research facility, which created the CAP-1 Planalto aircraft

== Sports ==
- Israel–Premier Tech, a cycling team
- Italian Poker Tour, series of poker tournaments in Italy and Italian speaking countries

== Technology ==
- Information Processes and Technology, a NSW Higher School Certificate course in information systems
- IP telephony, or Voice over Internet Protocol
- iPod Touch
- IPT color space, a method of mapping colors in a video system
- iptables, utility program
- MATLAB's standard Image Processing Toolbox
- Inductive power transfer, a form of wireless power transfer
- Inverted page table, a type of page table in a computer operating system

== Other ==
- Infant Potty Training, a book by Laurie Boucke
- Insurance Premium Tax (United Kingdom)
- Integrated product team; similarly, integrated process or project team
- International Pool Tour, a former sports tour for pocket billiards
- Iqaluit Public Transit, system operated from July 2003 to January 2005
- Williamsport Regional Airport, by IATA code

== See also ==
- IPTS (disambiguation)
