= OpenFabrics Alliance =

Organization

- Formation: June 2004
- Type: Non-profit organization
- Purpose: Industry trade group
- Website: http://www.openfabrics.org/

The OpenFabrics Alliance is a non-profit organization that promotes remote direct memory access (RDMA) switched fabric technologies for server and storage connectivity. These high-speed data-transport technologies are used in high-performance computing facilities, in research and various industries.

The OpenFabrics Alliance aims to develop open-source software that supports the three major RDMA fabric technologies: InfiniBand, RDMA over Converged Ethernet (RoCE) and iWARP. The software includes two packages, one that runs on Linux and FreeBSD and one that runs on Microsoft Windows. The alliance worked with two large Linux distributors—SUSE and Red Hat—as well as Microsoft on compatibility with their operating systems.

== History ==
Founded in June 2004 as the OpenIB Alliance, the organization originally developed an InfiniBand software stack for Linux. Initial funding for the Alliance was provided by the United States Department of Energy. The alliance released the first version of the OpenFabrics Enterprise Distribution (OFED) in 2005.

In 2005 the OpenIB Alliance announced support for Microsoft Windows. In 2006, the organization again expanded its charter to include support for iWARP, which is a transport technology that competes with InfiniBand. At that time the alliance changed its name to the OpenFabrics Alliance. Subsequent releases have added support for iWARP and Windows.

In 2011, OFED stack was ported to FreeBSD and included in FreeBSD 9.

== OpenFabrics Enterprise Distribution ==
A community of developers from hardware manufacturers, software vendors, system integrators, government agencies and academia continue to work on OFED. The OpenFabrics Alliance provides architectures, software repositories, interoperability tests, bug databases, workshops, and BSD- and GPL-licensed code to facilitate development.

The OFED stack includes software drivers, core kernel-code, middleware, and user-level interfaces. It offers a range of standard protocols, including IPoIB (IP over InfiniBand), SDP, SRP, iSER, RDS and DAPL (the Direct Access Programming Library). It also supports many other protocols, including various MPI implementations, and it supports many file systems, including Lustre and NFS over RDMA.

== Interoperability testing ==
On June 25, 2007, the OpenFabrics Alliance announced the OFA-UNH-IOL Logo Program in partnership with the University of New Hampshire InterOperability Laboratory. The program enables manufacturers of InfiniBand and iWARP products to test and certify that their products support the OpenFabrics software stack, and test their compatibility with other products.

The alliance sponsors interoperability events at the University of New Hampshire. The test scenarios are available to the public, as are the test results for all products that earn the logo. During interoperability events, all participating companies have the opportunity to observe all tests run on all products.

== Members ==
Corporate members of the OpenFabrics Alliance include Advanced Micro Devices, Appro, Broadcom, Cray Inc., Chelsio Communications, Cisco Systems, DataDirect Networks, Emulex, Flextronics, Hewlett Packard, Huawei, IBM, Intel, LSI Corporation, Mellanox Technologies, NetEffect, Neterion, NetApp, NetXen, Oracle Corporation, QLogic, RapidIO, Red Hat, Silicon Graphics, SuSE and System Fabric Works.

Research members include:

- Lawrence Livermore National Laboratory
- Los Alamos National Laboratory
- Sandia National Laboratories

Consulting members include the Ethernet Alliance, the InfiniBand Trade Association, Lamprey Networks, Ohio State University, and the University of New Hampshire InterOperability Laboratory. In 2007, Credit Suisse became the first financial-services firm to join the alliance.
