= Target Disk Mode =

Boot mode on certain Macintosh computers

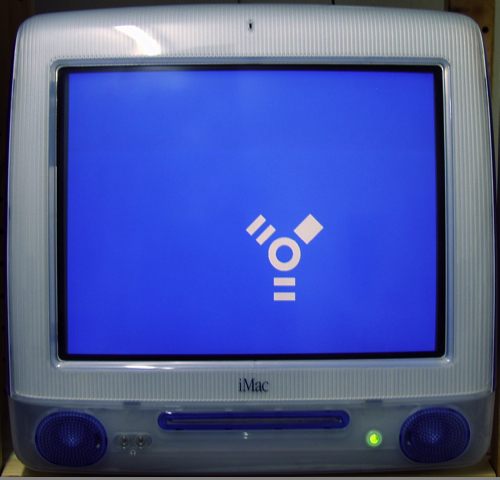
Apple G3 iMac booted in Target Mode

Target Disk Mode (sometimes referred to as TDM or Target Mode, formerly SCSI Disk Mode) is a boot mode unique to Macintosh computers.

When a Mac that supports Target Disk Mode is started with the 'T' key held down, its operating system does not boot. Instead, the Mac's firmware enables its drives to behave as a SCSI, FireWire, Thunderbolt, or USB-C external mass storage device.

A Mac booted in Target Mode can be attached to the port of any other computer, Mac or Windows, where it will appear as an external device. Hard drives within the target Mac, for example, can be formatted or partitioned exactly like any other external drive. Some computers will also make their internal CD/DVD drives and other internal and external peripheral hardware available to the host computer.

Target Disk Mode is useful for accessing the contents of a Mac which cannot load its own operating system. Target Disk Mode is the preferred form of old-computer to new-computer interconnect used by Apple's Migration Assistant. Migration Assistant supports Ethernet (wired) or Wi-Fi, which TDM does not. Neither supports USB; however, Thunderbolt-to-FireWire, Thunderbolt-to-Gigabit-Ethernet, and USB-3.0-to-Gigabit-Ethernet adapters are an option when one of the computers does not have FireWire or Thunderbolt.

== History ==
Apple introduced disk mode access with the original PowerBook 100 and continued to offer it with most subsequent PowerBook series and FireWire-equipped Macs. As long as the requisite software appeared in the system ROM, the Mac could be booted into disk mode.

Target Disk Mode was originally called SCSI Disk Mode, and a special cable (SCSI System Cable) allowed the original PowerBook series to attach to a desktop Mac as an external SCSI disk. A unique system control panel on the PowerBook was used to select a non-conflicting SCSI ID number from the host Mac. This also made it possible to select the disk in the Startup control panel and boot up from it.

With the change to IDE drives starting with the PowerBook 150 and 190, Apple implemented HD Target Mode, which essentially enabled SCSI Disk Mode by translating the external SCSI commands via the ATA driver. Officially reserved for Apple's portables only, the mode was supported by all PowerBooks except the 140, 145, 145B, 150 and 170. However, SCSI Disk Mode can be implemented unofficially on any Macintosh with an external SCSI port by suspending the startup process with the interrupt switch, as long as all internal drives on the chain can be set to different IDs than the active host system's devices.

When Apple dropped the SCSI interface, starting with the AGP Power Mac G4 and “Pismo” PowerBook G3, FireWire Target Disk mode replaced the earlier disk mode implementation, also receiving official support beyond laptops to all subsequent Macs with built-in FireWire.

Thunderbolt supports Target Disk Mode.

The 12-inch Retina MacBook (early 2015) has only one expansion port, a USB-C port that supports charging, external displays, and Target Disk Mode. Using Target Disk Mode on this MacBook requires a cable that supports USB 3.0 or USB 3.1, with either a USB-A or USB-C connector on one end and a USB-C connector on the other end for the MacBook.

With the Mac transition to Apple silicon, Apple replaced Target Disk Mode with Mac Sharing Mode.

== System requirements ==
The target computer (the computer to be placed into TDM) must:

- Have FireWire or Thunderbolt Port
- Have an ATA device at ATA bus 0
- Be any Macintosh except the following models:
  - iMac (Tray-Loading)
  - Power Macintosh G3 (Blue & White)
  - iBook G3 models without FireWire
  - Power Macintosh G4 (PCI Graphics)
  - MacBook Air (2008-2010)
  - MacBook (Unibody)

The host computer (the computer into which the Target Disk Mode booted computer is plugged) merely needs to meet the same requirements as for any external mass storage device using the bus in question, and (if access to native Mac formatted partitions such as the boot volume is desired) support for the correct version of Hierarchical File System. On Classic Mac OS, this means FireWire 2.3.3 or later and Mac OS 8.6 or later are required to use a FireWire target.

The host computer may run Microsoft Windows, but with some possible shortcomings: to read a Mac's HFS-formatted partitions, extra drivers such as MacDrive, TransMac, MacDisk, or HFSExplorer are necessary. Users also must ensure their computer possesses appropriate interface hardware in order to physically connect to a Mac in Target Mode. MacDrive also has a read-only option to prevent any accidental editing of the computer in Target Disk Mode; however, this mode cannot be set after an HFS/HFS+ disk is mounted. With the addition of HFS drivers into Apple's Boot Camp, it has also become possible for Macs running Windows to read (but not write) HFS partitions, without the purchase of software. Users have separated these drivers from the main Bootcamp install, so that they now also install on other Windows computers.

Host computers running Linux are also able to read and write to a Mac's HFS or HFS+ formatted devices through Target Disk Mode. It is working out-of-the-box on most distributions as HFS+ support is part of the Linux kernel. The hfsprogs package may be separately installed to check the volumes for errors. As it is directly derived from Apple's open-source code for the macOS diskutil (diskdev_cmds), it should match in terms of supported features save for a lag in keeping up with Apple’s new versions.

The new APFS file system requires commercial tools to access from Windows. On Linux there are tools providing for read and (highly experimental) write access. No reliable check tool is available as Apple has not released the code for their fsck_apfs tool, though there is one apfsprogs written according to Apple’s APFS specification.

In any case, for the purpose of data rescue, direct access to the file system is not always necessary: it suffices to save a disk image file into a reliable storage medium so that a computer with the ability to read the file system can access it later without needing to connect to the failing Target Disk. Any operation that modifies the Target Disk in question should be avoided in data rescue; this includes not only file-system writes, but also file-system repairs.

== Non-Macintosh analogues ==
Although the Target Disk Mode is a feature of the Macintosh firmware, some vendors have opted to include similar features on their software and/or hardware.

In Linux, several competing pieces of software implement the ability to present a SCSI target from a Linux machine; these include LIO Target and SCST. A wide variety of underlying connections for the SCSI protocol can be used allowed, including iSCSI, FireWire, Fiber Channel, and USB.

However, presenting a USB device requires a USB controller that is capable of operating in "device" (as opposed to "host"; also called "peripheral" or "gadget") mode, a feature that was virtually absent on PCs until the adoption of USB-C (even then the ability to present as a gadget is not guaranteed; Thunderbolt 3/USB4 or later provide a different solution called Thunderbolt Networking, where a cable connecting two computers builds an Ethernet connection instead of a host-gadget relationship). On the other hand, Linux-based embedded devices such as Android phones and Raspberry Pis are generally capable of operating as a "device" because they include the required controller.

The network block device protocol allows a computer to present the raw contents of a disk (block device) to another computer over a network connection (e.g. a Local Area Network, two computers directly wired together using a 8P8C cable without a gateway in between, or Thunderbolt Networking). It can be used for imagining a disk remotely, though it (like the SCSI target) requires the computer to be able to boot into Linux or another operating system with this functionality in the first place. Such a bootup is not always possible depending on configuration (e.g. whether booting from an external device is allowed) and the degree of damage.

== See also ==
- NetBoot
