= Sockets Direct Protocol =

Low-level remote-computing protocol

The Sockets Direct Protocol (SDP) is a transport-agnostic protocol to support stream sockets over remote direct memory access (RDMA) network fabrics. SDP was originally defined by the Software Working Group (SWG) of the InfiniBand Trade Association. Originally designed for InfiniBand (IB), SDP is currently maintained by the OpenFabrics Alliance.

== Protocol ==
SDP defines a standard wire protocol over an RDMA fabric to support stream sockets (SOCK_STREAM). SDP uses various RDMA network features for high-performance zero-copy data transfers. SDP is a pure wire-protocol level specification and does not go into any socket API or implementation specifics.

The purpose of the Sockets Direct Protocol is to provide an RDMA-accelerated alternative to the TCP protocol on IP. The goal is to do this in a manner which is transparent to the application.

Solaris 10 and Solaris 11 Express include support for SDP. Several other Unix operating system variants plan to include support for Sockets Direct Protocol. Windows offers a subsystem called Winsock Direct, which could be used to support SDP.

SDP support was introduced to the JDK 7 release of the Java Platform, Standard Edition (July 2011) for applications deployed in on Solaris and Linux operating systems (OFED 1.4.2 and 1.5). Oracle Database 11g supports connection over SDP.

Sockets Direct Protocol only deals with stream sockets, and if installed in a system, bypasses the OS resident TCP stack for stream connections between any endpoints on the RDMA fabric. All other socket types (such as datagram, raw, packet, etc.) are supported by the Linux IP stack and operate over standard IP interfaces (i.e., IPoIB on InfiniBand fabrics). The IP stack has no dependency on the SDP stack; however, the SDP stack depends on IP drivers for local IP assignments and for IP address resolution for endpoint identifications.

SDP is used by the Australian telecommunications company Telstra on their 3G platform Next G to deliver streaming mobile TV.

This protocol has been deprecated or not maintained by OFED in the latest releases, hence look for alternatives. The probable suggestions will be RSocket, Winsock, etc.
