= Omni-Path =

Communication architecture

Omni-Path Architecture (OPA) is a high-performance communication architecture developed by Intel. It aims for low communication latency, low power consumption and a high throughput. It directly competes with InfiniBand. Intel planned to develop technology based on this architecture for exascale computing. The current owner of Omni-Path is Cornelis Networks.

== History ==
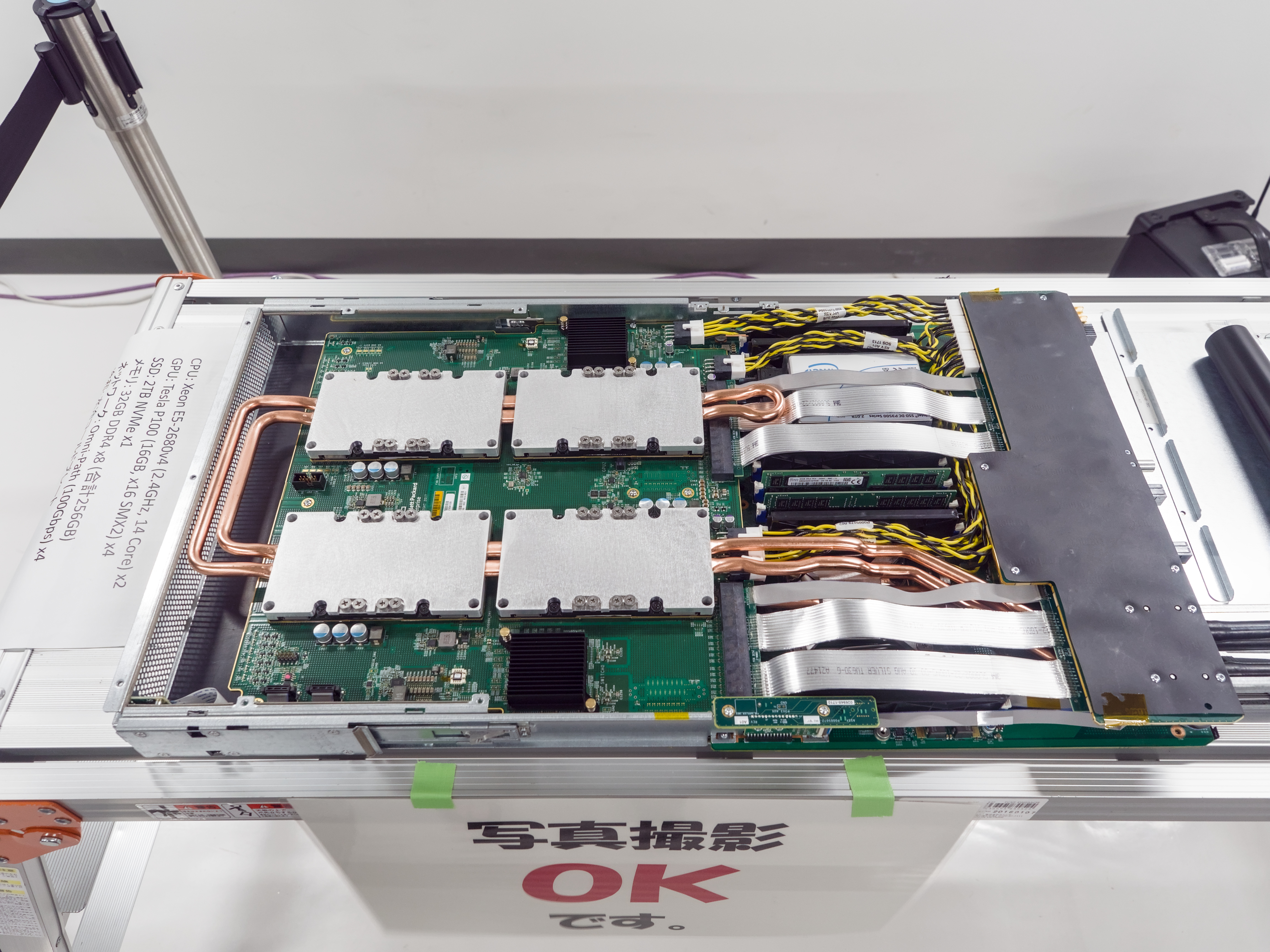
Computing node of TSUBAME 3.0 supercomputer with four Omni-Path connections

Production of Omni-Path products started in 2015 and delivery of these products started in the first quarter of 2016. In November 2015, adapters based on the 2-port "Wolf River" ASIC were announced, using QSFP28 connectors with channel speeds up to 100 Gbit/s. Simultaneously, switches based on the 48-port "Prairie River" ASIC were announced. First models of that series were available starting in 2015.

In April 2016, implementation of the InfiniBand "verbs" interface for the Omni-Path fabric was discussed.

In October 2016, IBM, Hewlett Packard Enterprise, Dell, Lenovo, Samsung, Seagate Technology, Micron Technology, Western Digital and SK Hynix announced a joint consortium called Gen-Z to develop an open specification and architecture for non-volatile storage and memory products—including Intel's 3D Xpoint technology—which might in part compete against Omni-Path. Intel offered their Omni-Path products and components via other (hardware) vendors. For example, Dell EMC offered Intel Omni-Path as Dell Networking H-series, following the naming-standard of Dell Networking in 2017.

In July 2019, Intel announced it would not continue development of Omni-Path networks and canceled OPA 200 series (200-Gbps variant of Omni-Path).

In September 2020, Intel announced that the Omni-Path network products and technology would be spun out into a new venture with Cornelis Networks. Intel would continue to maintain support for legacy Omni-Path products, while Cornelis Networks continues the product line, leveraging existing Intel intellectual property related to Omni-Path architecture.

In 2021, Cornelis announced Omni-Path Express, which replaces PSM2-based drivers and middleware, which trace back to PathScale's PSM created in 2003, for the existing Omni-Path hardware, with a native libfabric provider.

== See also ==
- iWARP
- RDMA over Converged Ethernet (RoCE)
- Remote direct memory access (RDMA)
