= Gen-Z (consortium) =

Trade group of technology vendors

Gen-Z Consortium
- Formation: October 11, 2016
- Dissolved: January 2022; 4 years ago; transferred to Compute Express Link

The Gen-Z Consortium was a trade group of technology vendors involved in designing CPUs, random access memory, servers, storage, and accelerators. The goal was to design an open and royalty-free "memory-semantic" bus protocol, which is not limited by the memory controller of a CPU, to be used in either a switched fabric or a point-to-point device link on a standard connector.

In November 2021, the GenZ Consortium voted to transfer all its specifications and intellectual property to the CXL Consortium.

== History ==
The consortium was publicly announced on October 11, 2016.

Members include server vendors Cisco Systems, Cray, Dell Technologies, Hewlett Packard Enterprise, Huawei, IBM, and Lenovo. CPU vendor members include Advanced Micro Devices, ARM Holdings, Broadcom Limited, IBM, and Marvell. Memory and storage vendor members include Micron Technology, Samsung, Seagate Technology, SK Hynix, and Western Digital. Other members include IDT Corporation, IntelliProp, Mellanox Technologies, Microsemi, Red Hat, and Xilinx. Analysts noted the absence of Intel, which announced an inter-connect technology of its own called Omni-Path a year before, and Nvidia, with its own NVLink technology. Gen-Z also maintains cooperation with industry alliances such as OpenFabrics, SNIA, and DMTF.

The effort followed years of delays with product availability for version 4.0 of PCI Express. Some of the vendors also joined a group to promote the cache coherent interconnect for accelerators (CCIX) protocol on the same day. At about the same time, yet another consortium formed to work on an open specification for the Coherent Accelerator Processor Interface (CAPI).

The first version of the GenZ Core specifications was published in 2018; it defined a physical link with both PCI Express and 50 Gigabit Ethernet physical layer (PHY) standards. The Gen-Z protocol allows for asymmetric links with more bandwidth in one direction, and supports connection topologies like point to point links, daisy-chaining, and switched fabrics. The basic operations consist of simple loads and stores with the addition of modular extensions.

== Collaboration with CXL ==
On April 2, 2020, the Compute Express Link (CXL) and Gen-Z Consortiums announced a memorandum of understanding (MOU), describing collaboration between the two groups. By October 2020, some technologies were demonstrated at the super computing conference, but no products were announced.

In November 2021 the CXL Consortium and the GenZ Consortium signed a letter of intent for Gen-Z to transfer its specifications and assets to CXL, leaving CXL as the sole industry standard moving forward. In January 2022, GenZ started the process of dissolving operations and transferring all assets to CXL.
