= LPT (disambiguation) =

LPT signifies the line printer, and is the designation of a parallel port interface on some personal computer systems.

LPT may refer to:

== Finance ==
- Listed property trust, an Australian real estate investment trust
- Local property tax (Ireland)

== Science and technology ==
- Lagrangian particle tracking, in computational fluid dynamics
- Leptotes (plant), an orchid genus
- Line printer, a type of computer printer
- Parallel port, an I/O port on a computer
- Longest-processing-time-first scheduling, a multi-processor job scheduling method
- Low Power Transceiver experiment, on the Space Shuttle
- Long period radio transient, a class of astronomical events

== Other uses ==
- East Coast Expressway (Lebuhraya Pantai Timur), Malaysia
- Little Princess Trust, a UK charity
- Life Pro Tip, an informal abbreviation on some Web forums such as Reddit
- Libertarianian Party Texas, the state affilate for the Libertarian Party

== See also ==
- LPT1-LPT4, MS-DOS device driver names for parallel printers
- IPT (disambiguation)
