= IPtronics =

Danish fabless semiconductor company

IPtronics A/S
- Industry: Semiconductors
- Founded: Copenhagen, Denmark (September 2003)
- Headquarters: Copenhagen, Denmark
- Products: Low-Power Single- & Multi-Channel Broadband Transimpedance Amplifiers (TIA) and VCSEL Drivers for Optical Data Communication Applications
- Parent: Mellanox Technologies
- Subsidiaries: IPtronics Inc., Menlo Park, California.
- Website: www.iptronics.com

IPtronics was a fabless semiconductor company headquartered in Copenhagen, Denmark. Its products include integrated circuits for parallel optical interconnect applications intended for the computer, storage and communication industries. IPtronics' design center is certified by STMicroelectronics, which is also their semiconductor foundry partner. In June 2013, IPtronics was acquired by Mellanox Technologies.

== History ==
IPtronics was founded in 2003 and built up by former directors, managers and engineers from Giga A/S, which was acquired by Intel Corporation in 2000 for US$1.25 billion. On June 4, 2013, it was announced that IPtronics was acquired by Mellanox Technologies at a total cash purchase price of approximately $47.5 million, subject to certain adjustments.

=== Founders and staff ===
Three former Giga employees, Niels Finseth, Steen Bak Christensen, and Eivind Johansen, co-founded IPtronics. Giga A/S specialized in products for telecommunication and data communication applications, as for example OC-48 and OC-192. Finseth was previously an engineering manager, responsible for all 10 Gbit/s IC product development. Mr. Christensen was also previously an engineering manager, responsible for all 2.5 Gbit/s development. Johansen was a co-founder of Giga (1987) as well, serving as the technical director until the acquisition by Intel, followed by a CTO position at Intel's Optical Component Division (OCD) and being appointed Intel Fellow in 2001, a corporate VP position for his technical leadership in optical communication. In May 2004, Henning Lysdal was recruited as COO, previously high-speed PHY development manager at Intel OCD. Lysdal later became VP of engineering after hiring a dedicated director of operations. Two former colleagues from Giga/Intel, who were at that time CEOs in their respective Danish electronic companies, were recruited to IPtronics. Steen Gundersen came from a position as the CEO of Alight Technologies and Jesper Wolf Bek came from a position as the CEO of Kaleido Technology.

In the beginning, the founders worked together in the garage of Steen Bak Christensen in Roskilde. As the first employee was hired in February 2005, IPtronics moved into new premises outside Roskilde. Giga had customer support.

In 2006, Intel closed its Danish office, which resulted in even more new electronics start-ups in Copenhagen metropolitan area as well as many employees joining already existing companies such as IPtronics. However, several new additions to the staff from 2008 and beyond have a different background than from Giga or Intel, such as Navid Ostadian-Binai. During 2006, the company appointed Jørgen Bardenfleth as chairman of the board of directors. Bardenfleth is the country general manager of Microsoft Denmark. In November 2011, IPtronics announced Martin Rofheart as chairman.

=== Early products ===
The company's first customer was CERN, the European Organization for Nuclear Research. The IPtronics chips were produced with TriQuint Semiconductor's GaAs foundry process technology. These devices are being used as front-end electronics for Resistive Plate Chambers (RPC), a gaseous particle detector capable of sub-nanosecond time resolution on very large areas.

In October 2005, IPtronics started developing optical interconnects in a collaboration with NEC Corporation.

=== Expansion ===
During the summer of 2008, IPtronics opened its North American office in Silicon Valley.

In April 2010, IPtronics joined the InfiniBand Trade Association, which promoted InfiniBand technology. IPtronics announced it would offer low power and high volume products. IPtronics later also joined the associations, Optical Internetworking Forum and Peripheral Component Interconnect Special Interest Group.

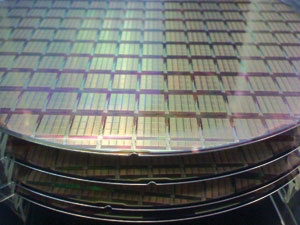
Semiconductor wafers, showing IPtronics designed ICs for parallel optical interconnects using a STMicroelectronics fabrication process

== Technology ==
This technology enables parallel optical interconnect systems that computer manufactures have begun to adopt in order to overcome the physical constraints from using copper-based connections over high speed interfaces and backplanes. Parallel optics is introduced to be able to simultaneously transmit and receive data at high bandwidths over multiple fibers, initially implemented in supercomputers and servers followed by an upcoming introduction into consumer electronics. In June 2011, IPtronics announced it had reached a shipment milestone, passing 1 million ICs, and the company states the majority is shipped to Asia.

=== Active optical cables ===
Late 2007, IPtronics started shipping 4-channel and 12-channel chipsets capable of operating at a minimum of 10 Gbit/s per channel, primarily targeting data center and supercomputer applications. A chipset consists of a VCSEL driver and a Transimpedance amplifier (TIA). The company also states to have qualified solder bump versions of the same two chipsets to be used for flip chip mounting, the preferred assembly technology in high-volume production. Early 2010, IPtronics announced 16 Gbit/s versions of their 4- and 12-channel VCSEL drivers and TIAs.

The company announced in June 2010 it would address the market for "lower rates", especially driven by HDMI cables, at higher volumes, and a lower cost structure than active optical cables for InfiniBand. At the 2010 China International Optoelectronic Exposition and European Conference and Exhibition on Optical Communication, the company presented a demonstration of their optical HDMI by transmitting signals from a Blu-ray DVD player to a LCD television, targeted for 2011. In January 2011, IPtronics released a new 4-channel chipset for pluggable module applications, and the company claims to have reduced the power consumption compared to their first-generation 4-channel chipset.

In March 2012, IPtronics announced 28 Gbit/s/channel parts.

=== Thunderbolt (interface) ===
IPtronics first announced it would develop Thunderbolt technology (original code-name Light Peak) in 2009. Thunderbolt was brought to market by Apple in February 2011, and Light Peak is Intel's code-name for the new high-speed cable technology designed to connect consumer electronic devices to each other using copper or optical interconnect. IPtronics is a supplier of driver and receiver ICs that go into the optical module, performing the conversion from electricity to light and vice versa, using miniature lasers and photodetectors. The ICs from IPtronics are dual-channel, where each channel operates at a minimum of 10 Gbit/s.

In October 2010, the company announced a new silicon revision. They claim the same cost competitiveness, enabling optical module and -cable applications such as Thunderbolt implementation, though now also single channel optical links up to 14 Gbit/s. Besides Thunderbolt, the devices are claimed to be used for data center and other kinds of cables.
