= Eyal Waldman =

Israeli businessman

- איל וולדמן
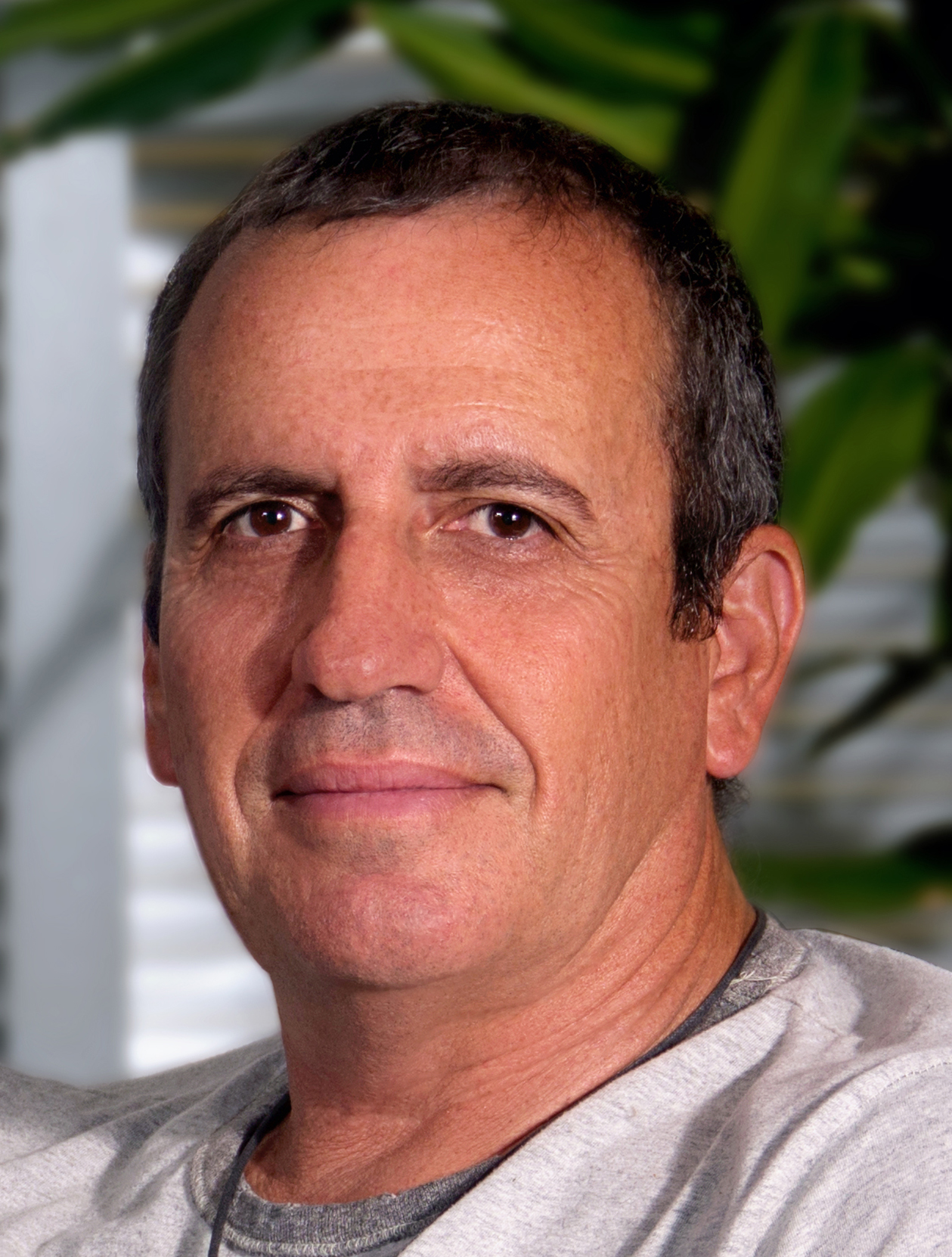
- Waldman in 2015
- Occupations: Businessman; philanthropist; peace activist
- Known for: Co-founding Mellanox Technologies, activism for the two-state solution
- Awards: Israel Prize (2024)

Eyal Waldman (Hebrew: איל וולדמן) is an Israeli businessman, philanthropist, and peace activist. In 1999, he co-founded chip maker Mellanox Technologies, which Nvidia bought for US$6.9 billion in a deal announced in 2019 and completed in 2020. Waldman received the Israel Prize, Israel's highest civilian honor, in 2024.

== Biography ==
Waldman was born in Jerusalem. His mother holds a Ph.D. in chemistry and his father is an economist. He has a non-identical twin brother and two half-sisters from his father's second marriage. During his teen years, his family moved to Scotland for 2.5 years due to his mother's post doctorate program.

Waldman served as an infantry officer in the Golani Brigade in the Israel Defense Forces. After the army, he studied for a degree in chemical engineering at the Technion-Israel Institute of Technology before moving to computer science. After receiving a master's degree in electrical engineering, Waldman began working for Intel in 1989. After four years at Intel, Waldman was the vice president of engineering at startup Galileo from 1993 to 1999.

In 1999, Waldman co-founded Israeli chip maker Mellanox Technologies with three friends from Intel in Yokne’am. Nvidia announced in March 2019 that it would buy the company for US$6.9 billion and completed the purchase in April 2020, after Chinese regulators approved it. As part of the sale, Waldman received approximately US$250 million from his 3.6% stake in the company. Mellanox went public on Nasdaq in 2007 under his leadership.

Waldman left Mellanox in November 2020, six months after Nvidia completed the purchase. He told Globes that he had known when the deal closed that he would leave. He founded the investment company Waldo Holdings, and was its chairman as of September 2024. In September 2024, it was reported that Waldman would join the board of Cato Networks as an independent director on 1 October 2024.

== Activism and philanthropy ==
Waldman supports the two state solution. After the 7 October attacks, he stated that, "I hope in two to four years we'll be able to do peace and build two states for the two people and be able to live together next to each other."

Waldman is among a group of Israeli businessmen who are part of Breaking the Impasse, a forum of Israelis and Palestinians in favor of advancing a diplomatic solution to the Israeli–Palestinian conflict.

At Mellanox, Waldman hired 200 engineers, including 20 in the Gaza Strip and 80 in the West Bank town of Rawabi, in a belief that Israeli and Palestinians working together would lead to peace.

Waldman opened a design center in Gaza and donated US$360,000 to an oncology ward at a hospital in Gaza in 2020. He also created jobs for Palestinians in the West Bank and the Gaza Strip.

Waldman and fellow Israeli entrepreneur Izhar Shay launched project Next October in December 2023, pledging to help create 1,200 next startups in honor of the victims of the October 7 attacks, with each startup bearing the name of someone who was killed. Around 150 companies, including Meta, OurCrowd, and Pitango, were confirmed as partners.

In 2024, Waldman was announced as a recipient of the Israel Prize, the country's highest civilian honor. Education Minister Yoav Kisch had previously requested that the prize committee not award the honor to Waldman due to his criticism of Prime Minister Benjamin Netanyahu and the 2023 Israeli judicial reform.

== Personal ==
Waldman's youngest daughter Danielle Waldman and her boyfriend Noam Shai were two of the 378 people murdered during the Re'im music festival massacre that was part of the 2023 Hamas-led attack on Israel. When Waldman received word that Danielle was missing, he flew back to Israel from Indonesia and tracked her location via her Apple Watch. Her body was found on 9 October.

Jensen Huang, CEO of Nvidia, sent a letter to employees in Israel offering support and condolences to Waldman on the killing of his daughter.
