= Datera =

- Industry: Data Storage
- Founded: 2013
- Founder: Marc Fleischmann; Nicholas Bellinger; Claudio Fleiner
- Headquarters: Santa Clara, California
- Key people: Guy Churchward (CEO), Flavio Santoni (Chief Revenue Officer), Narasimha Valiveti (Chief Product Officer)
- Services: Enterprise-grade software-defined block and object data services platform for private and hybrid cloud environments
- Number of employees: 350+
- Website: www.datera.io

Datera was a global enterprise software company headquartered in Santa Clara, California that developed an enterprise software-defined storage platform.

The Datera Data Services Platform is the company's commercial product aimed at hyperscale storage environments and cloud service providers who want to deploy a hybrid cloud, autonomous and dynamic data infrastructure. Datera software deploys on industry-standard servers from Dell EMC, Fujitsu, Hewlett Packard Enterprise, Intel, Lenovo, Supermicro, and QUANTA to store blocks and objects in on-premises data centers, and private cloud and hybrid cloud environments.

== History ==
Datera was co-founded in 2013 by contributors to open-source LIO (SCSI target) storage, Marc Fleischmann, Nicholas Bellinger and Claudio Fleiner. In 2016, Datera emerged from stealth and raised $40 million in funding from Khosla Ventures, Samsung Ventures, Andy Bechtolsheim, and Pradeep Sindhu.

Datera partnered with open source private cloud platform, vScaler in 2017 to deliver scalable private clouds for a range of workloads from high-performance databases to archival storage.

Flavio Santoni, the former EVP at LSI Corporation and former CEO of Syncsort, was appointed Chief Revenue Officer in January 2017. Narasimha Valiveti, former VP of software engineering at Dell EMC was appointed Chief Product Officer in May 2018. Guy Churchward, the former CEO at DataTorrent and Divisional President of Core Technologies at Dell EMC, joined the Datera board of directors in 2018 and was appointed CEO in December of that year.

In January 2019, Datera announced a go-to-market partnership with Hewlett Packard Enterprise as part of the HPE Complete program to allow businesses to procure integrated solutions on a single HPE purchase order. Datera reported 500 percent business growth in the first half of 2019 that was attributed to the HPE partnership.

In October 2019, Datera announced the HPE Datera Cloud Kit in partnership with HPE, a pre-packaged configuration for HPE customers that included a Datera software license, HPE Smart Fabric Orchestrator license, HPE M-Series switches, HPE DL360 servers, cabling, and support for containers, virtual machines, and bare metal applications.

The company was named by CRN as an Emerging Storage Vendor in 2019.

In 2020, Datera achieved a “Veeam-Ready” designation in the repository category. The program (from backup solutions and cloud data management provider, Veeam) signifies the company partners that have met standards via a “qualification and testing program” and are certified to work in conjunction with one another. The platform also received Red Hat OpenStack Certification for the Datera Cinder driver with both Red Hat OpenStack Platform 13 and Red Hat OpenStack Platform 16.

The company announced a partner agreement with Fujitsu to integrate the Datera Data Services Platform into Fujitsu’s product portfolio and bring it to market globally.

On April 15, 2020, Datera Co-Founder and President Marc Fleishmann announced his departure from Datera to pursue new opportunities via a Linkedin posting.

On February 19, 2021, blockandfiles.com reported that Datera has gone into liquidation.

== Technology ==
Datera's principal product is a block, scale-out software-defined storage platform for transaction-intensive workloads that utilizes the iSCSI protocol. It provides elastic, primary storage for on-premises data centers, and private and hybrid cloud environments. Enterprises can combine different hardware and media from multiple vendors to create distributed, scale-out storage clusters for workloads running on bare metal, virtual machines, or containers. The software also uses automation and data orchestration to place data by location, node, and media type while continuously tuning performance for each application. The company states that this eliminates the need for manual administration. Datera uses artificial intelligence and machine learning to assess an organization's data environment and automatically takes actions to optimize it through user-defined policies.

Datera natively integrates with OpenStack, VMware vSphere, CloudStack and container orchestration platforms such as Docker, Kubernetes, and Mesos.
