= Reliable Datagram Sockets =

- Communication protocol
- Abbreviation: RDS
- Developer(s): Oracle Corporation
- Introduction: June 9, 2009; 16 years ago
- OSI layer: Transport layer
- Port(s): 16385 (RDS-over-TCP)

Reliable Datagram Sockets (RDS) is a high-performance, low-latency, reliable, connectionless protocol for delivering datagrams. It is developed by Oracle Corporation.

It was included in the Linux kernel 2.6.30 which was released on 9 June 2009. The code was contributed by the OpenFabrics Alliance (OFA).

On October 19, 2010, VSR announced CVE-2010-3904, a vulnerability within the Linux 2.6.30 kernel which could result in a local privilege escalation via the kernel's implementation of RDS. This was subsequently fixed in Linux 2.6.36.

On May 8, 2019, CVE-2019-11815 was published, regarding a race condition in the Linux RDS implementation that could lead to a use-after-free bug and possible arbitrary code execution. The bug has been fixed in Linux 5.0.8.

== Header ==
RDS Header
Size (bits)	Name	Description
be64	h_sequence	Sequence number
be64	h_ack	Sequence number of last received message
be32	h_len	Length of the message payload
be16	h_sport	Port on source node
be16	h_dport	Port on destination node
8	h_flags	Described below
8	h_credit	Credits given (used for credit-based flow control)
32	h_padding	Padding for 64-bit struct alignment
16	h_csum	1's complement header checksum
128	h_exthdr	Optional extension header space

RDS Header
Offset	Octet	0								1								2								3							
Octet	Bit	0	1	2	3	4	5	6	7	8	9	10	11	12	13	14	15	16	17	18	19	20	21	22	23	24	25	26	27	28	29	30	31
0	0	h_sequence																															
4	32	h_sequence																															
8	64	h_ack																															
12	96	h_ack																															
16	128	h_len																															
20	160	h_sport																h_dport															
24	192	h_flags								h_credit								h_padding…↴															
26	208	↪…h_padding																h_csum															
32	256	h_exthdr																															
36	288	h_exthdr																															
40	320	h_exthdr																															
44	352	h_exthdr																															

Sequence (h_sequence): 64 bits:The sequence number.
Acknowledge (h_ack): 64 bits:The sequence number of last received message.
Length (h_len): 32 bits:The length of the message payload.
Source Port (h_sport): 16 bits:Identifies the sending port.
Destination Port (h_dport): 16 bits:Identifies the receiving port.
Flags (h_flags): 8 bits:Described below.
Credits (h_credit): 8 bits:Credits given (used for credit-based flow control).
Padding (h_padding): 32 bits:Padding for 64-bit struct alignment.
Checksum (h_csum): 16 bits:1's complement header checksum.
Extension Header (h_exthdr): 128 bits:Optional extension header space.

== See also ==
- Transmission Control Protocol
- Stream Control Transmission Protocol
- User Datagram Protocol
- UDP-Lite
