= Neterion =

Former American technology company

- Formerly: S2io
- Company type: Private
- Industry: Computer Magazine Networking hardware
- Founded: September 2001 in California, US
- Fate: Acquired by Exar
- Key people: Avdhesh Palawat (CEO)
- Number of employees: 40 (2002)
- Website: Neterion

Neterion, founded as S2io in September 2001, was an American technology company. It provided networking hardware, notably to IBM and Hewlett-Packard. In 2010, Neterion was acquired by Exar for US$11,000,000.
