= Iqaluit Public Transit =

Defunct public transit agency in Iqualuit, Nunavut

- Founded: July 2003
- Defunct: January 10, 2005
- Locale: Iqaluit
- Service type: transit bus
- Fleet: 1
- Daily ridership: Average 28/day
- Operator: R.L. Hanson Construction Limited

The Iqaluit Public Transit system operated from July 2003 to January 2005 to provide public transportation in Iqaluit, Nunavut, Canada. Mounting costs and low ridership forced city council to cancel the service in late 2004 and it ceased operations in January 2005.

== History ==
Iqaluit previously operated bus services in the 1980s, and again during the Arctic Winter Games.

After paying approximately $137,000 for the service, the city had concluded that if they were to give taxi vouchers to every resident they would save almost $100,000 annually. Iqaluit had a 5-year contract with the R.L. Hanson Construction company to operate the service.

The topic of providing bus service in Iqaluit was considered again in December 2010, when city council members discussed it.

In May 2024, a privately owned company announced that they plan to offer a shuttle bus service utilizing a 32-seater bus from the community of Apex to the Iqaluit Airport, also with plans to collaborate with the city's administration, with hopes to get more vehicles and routes. They launched a new service named Iqaluit Transit in March 2026 with a single route that runs on weekdays and Saturdays. A base fare of $5 is payable with cash, credit cards, and a new smart card.

== Fleet ==
- 1 Ford B700 school bus - rented from R.L. Hanson
