= Bump Nonprofit Design Studio =

- Formation: 2008
- Type: Non-profit
- Purpose: Develop and deploy affordable prosthetic arms, Humanitarian aid
- Headquarters: Champaign, Illinois, U.S.
- Region served: Global
- President: Adam Booher
- Website: madebybump.org

Bump Nonprofit Design Studio (Bump) is a not for profit organization based in Champaign, Illinois that created the OpenSocket prosthetic arm.

== History ==
Founded as a student group (Illinois Prosthetics Team) at the University of Illinois in 2008, the group registered as a not for profit organization named Illini Prosthetics Technologies in 2009 and gained 501(c)(3) status in 2010. In 2012, the organization changed the name to Bump Nonprofit Design Studio.

== The OpenSocket ==
The OpenSocket prosthetic arm was designed by Bump and is a transradial body-powered prosthetic device with an adjustable socket. The OpenSocket is made up of a flexible plastic core enclosed in fabric. This flexible plastic core consists of two layers of low density polyethylene plastic that allows the device to change size and shape in order to fit different users with the same socket. The OpenSocket uses a standard harness and cable system to provide control over opening and closing the terminal device.
