= IPTS =

IPTS may refer to:

- Institute for Prospective Technological Studies, in Seville, Spain
- International Practical Temperature Scale, predecessors to the International Temperature Scale of 1990
