= Mellanox Technologies =

Israeli-American networking company (1999–2020)

Mellanox Technologies Ltd.

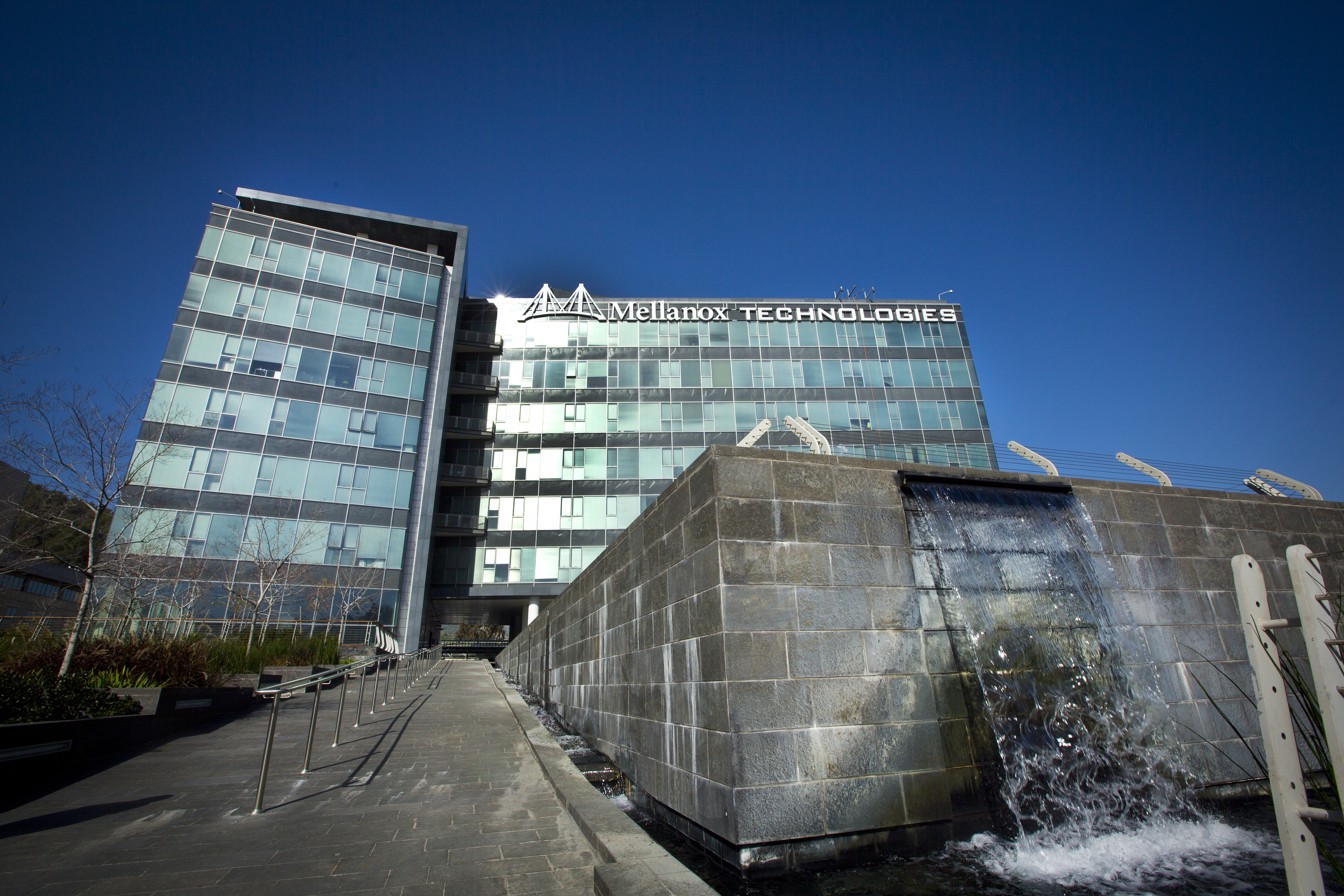
- Headquarters in Yokneam Illit
- Type: Subsidiary
- Traded as: Nasdaq: MLNX
- Industry: Computer networking
- Founded: May 1999 in Yokneam Illit, Israel
- Founders: Eyal Waldman, Shai Cohen, Roni Ashuri, Michael Kagan, Evelyn Landman, Shimon Rottenberg, Eitan Zahavi, Udi Katz, Alon Webman
- Defunct: April 27, 2020
- Fate: Acquired by Nvidia
- Headquarters: Sunnyvale, California, United States
- Products: Ethernet and InfiniBand switches, adapters, cables, silicon and software
- Revenue: ▲US$1.3306 billion (2019)
- Operating income: ▲US$207.9 million (2019)
- Net income: ▲US$205.1 million (2019)
- Number of employees: 2,800 (2020)
- Parent: Nvidia
- Website: www.nvidia.com/en-us/networking

Mellanox Technologies Ltd. (Hebrew: מלאנוקס טכנולוגיות בע"מ) was an Israeli-American multinational supplier of computer networking products based on InfiniBand and Ethernet technology. Mellanox offered adapters, switches, software, cables and silicon for markets including high-performance computing, data centers, cloud computing, computer data storage and financial services.

On March 11, 2019, Nvidia announced its intent to acquire the company for $6.9 billion. The deal closed on April 27, 2020, with approval from the EU, U.S. and Chinese antitrust authorities.

The company was integrated into Nvidia's networking division in 2020 and Nvidia stopped using the brand name "Mellanox" for its new networking products.

== History ==
=== 1999–2009 ===
Mellanox was founded in May 1999 by former Israeli executives of Intel Corporation and Galileo Technology (which was acquired by Marvell Technology Group in October 2000 for $2.8 billion) Eyal Waldman, Shai Cohen, Roni Ashuri, Michael Kagan, Evelyn Landman, Eitan Zahavi, Shimon Rottenberg, Udi Katz and Alon Webman. Eyal Waldman founded Mellanox in the Israeli city of Yokneam Illit. Financial offices were in Santa Clara, California in the USA. In February, 2002, a round of venture capital investment was announced of about $56 million. Later extended to about $64 million, investors included Intel, IBM, Sequoia Capital and U.S. Venture Partners.

Mellanox had its initial public offering in February, 2007, on NASDAQ that raised $102 million, and valued the company at over half a billion dollars. Its shares were listed under the symbol MLNX. Created in 2009, Mellanox's investment fund was publicly announced in 2014. Initially founded as an integrated circuit (chip) manufacturer, it evolved into a producer of complete network systems by 2009.

=== 2010–2016 ===
In 2010, Oracle Corporation became a major investor in the company, holding around 10% of its stock. Oracle uses InfiniBand technology in its Exadata and Exalogic appliances. Stock shares were also listed on the Tel Aviv Stock Exchange, until 2013 when the company de-listed itself, but remained on NASDAQ.

In February 2011, Mellanox acquired Voltaire Ltd., a provider of data center switches for about $218 million. In November 2012, Mellanox was named one of the fastest growing companies in North America by Deloitte.

In 2013 Mellanox acquired assets of XLoom Communications Ltd., including opto-electric chip-scale packaging, and some of XLoom's technology personnel. In July 2013, Mellanox acquired privately held Kotura, Inc., a developer of silicon photonics optical interconnect technology for high-speed networking. In July 2013, Mellanox acquired privately held IPtronics A/S, a designer of optical interconnect components for digital communications.

In July 2014, Mellanox acquired privately held Integrity Project, for its software connectivity, low-level development, real-time applications and security technology. In February 2016, Mellanox acquired publicly held EZchip Semiconductor, a provider of network processors and multi-core processors from EZchip's earlier acquisition of Tilera.

In 2016, Mellanox Technologies began to employ programmers in the Gaza Strip, in addition to its team of Israeli Arab programmers and programmers in Ramallah and Nablus. In 2016, Mellanox had revenues of $857 million. In December 2017, Mellanox announced it would start a new startup accelerator. Over 2017, shares in the company rose by 55 percent. That year, the company also made its largest acquisition with EZchip.

=== 2018–acquisition ===
The activist investor Starboard Value LP purchased a 10.7% stake in the company in November 2017. In January 2018, Starboard criticized the company's research and development spending and argued for short-term profits instead. The day after, on January 9, 2018, Mellanox announced it would immediately discontinue its 1550 nm silicon photonics development activities, with president and CEO Eyal Waldman saying the review of the silicon photonics business had started in May 2017. Mellanox also said it would fire 100 people, all in the US. At the time, the company employed 2,900 people, mostly in Israel.

In a "board battle," Starboard sent a letter to shareholders asking them to entirely replace the board of directors. At the time, Mellanox had a $3.3 billion market value. Starboard said it would nominate nine candidates for election to the company's board, including Starboard head Jeffrey Smith. In May, 2018, stockholders approved the company's governance proposals related to the possibility of the contested board elections. By June, 2018, three board members agreed to step down and be replaced by two Starboard candidates and one agreed upon by both sides.

In 2019, Mellanox was acquired for $6.9 billion by Nvidia Corporation making it one of the largest mergers and acquisitions in 2019. Other companies willing to acquire Mellanox were Intel, Xilinx and Microsoft. Founder and long-term CEO Eyal Waldman left the company in November, 2020. He made an estimated $240 million on the acquisition.

== Products and market ==
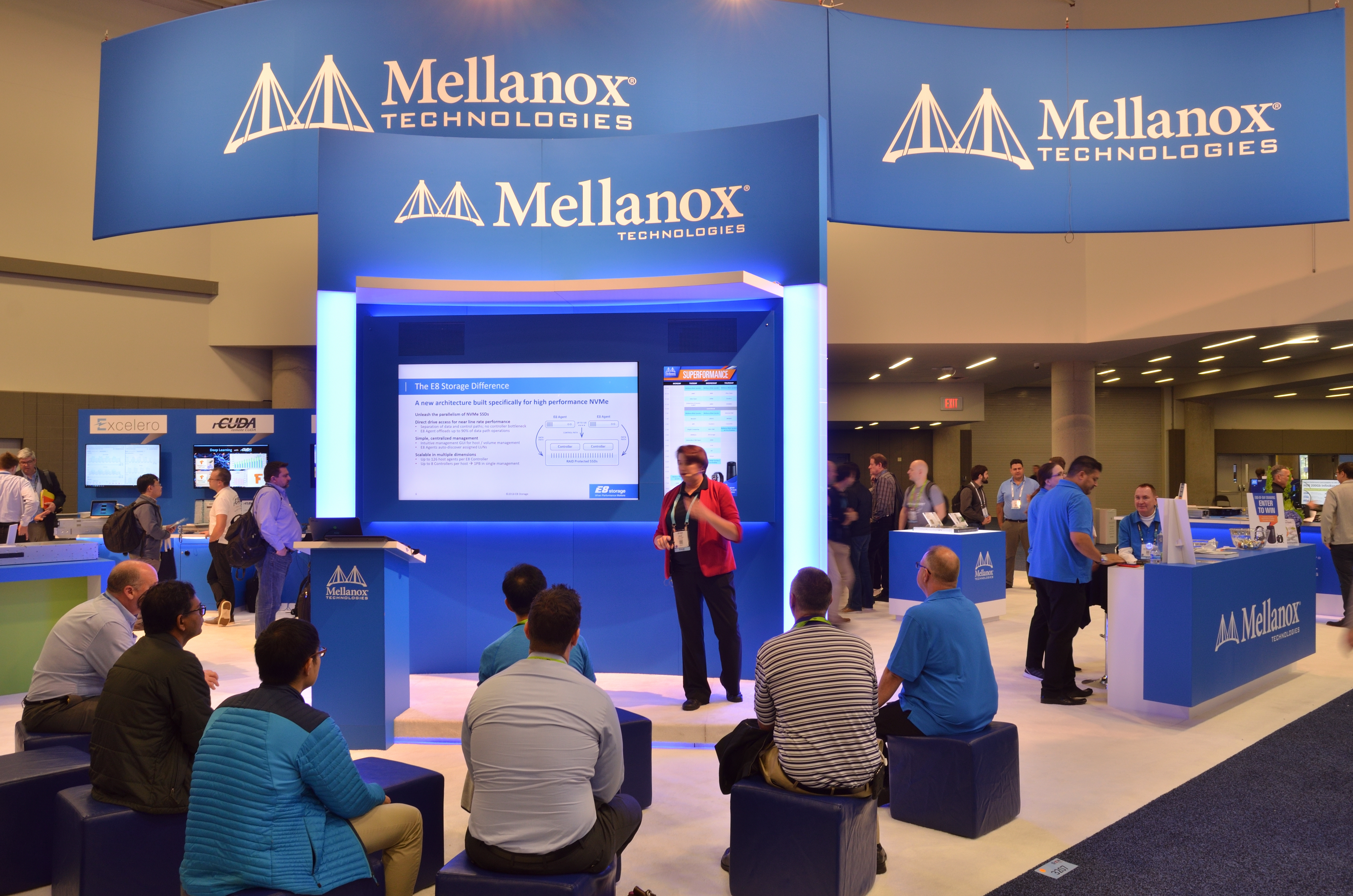
Mellanox at SC18

Mellanox was a fabless semiconductor company, which then sold products based on those semiconductor integrated circuits. Starting from at least 2011, its chips were produced by Taiwan Semiconductor Manufacturing Corp (TSMC). Mellanox Technologies provided Ethernet and InfiniBand network adapters, switches and cables for servers and storage used in cloud and enterprise data centers based on internally developed integrated circuits. Mellanox had two major customers, Hewlett-Packard and Dell EMC, which each contributed more than 10% of revenues in 2017, 2018, and 2019.

Mellanox specialized in switched fabrics for enterprise data centers and high performance computing, when high data rates and low latency are required such as in a computer cluster. One typical application was a large database management system. Mellanox network adapter and switches supported remote direct memory access (RDMA) and RDMA over Converged Ethernet.

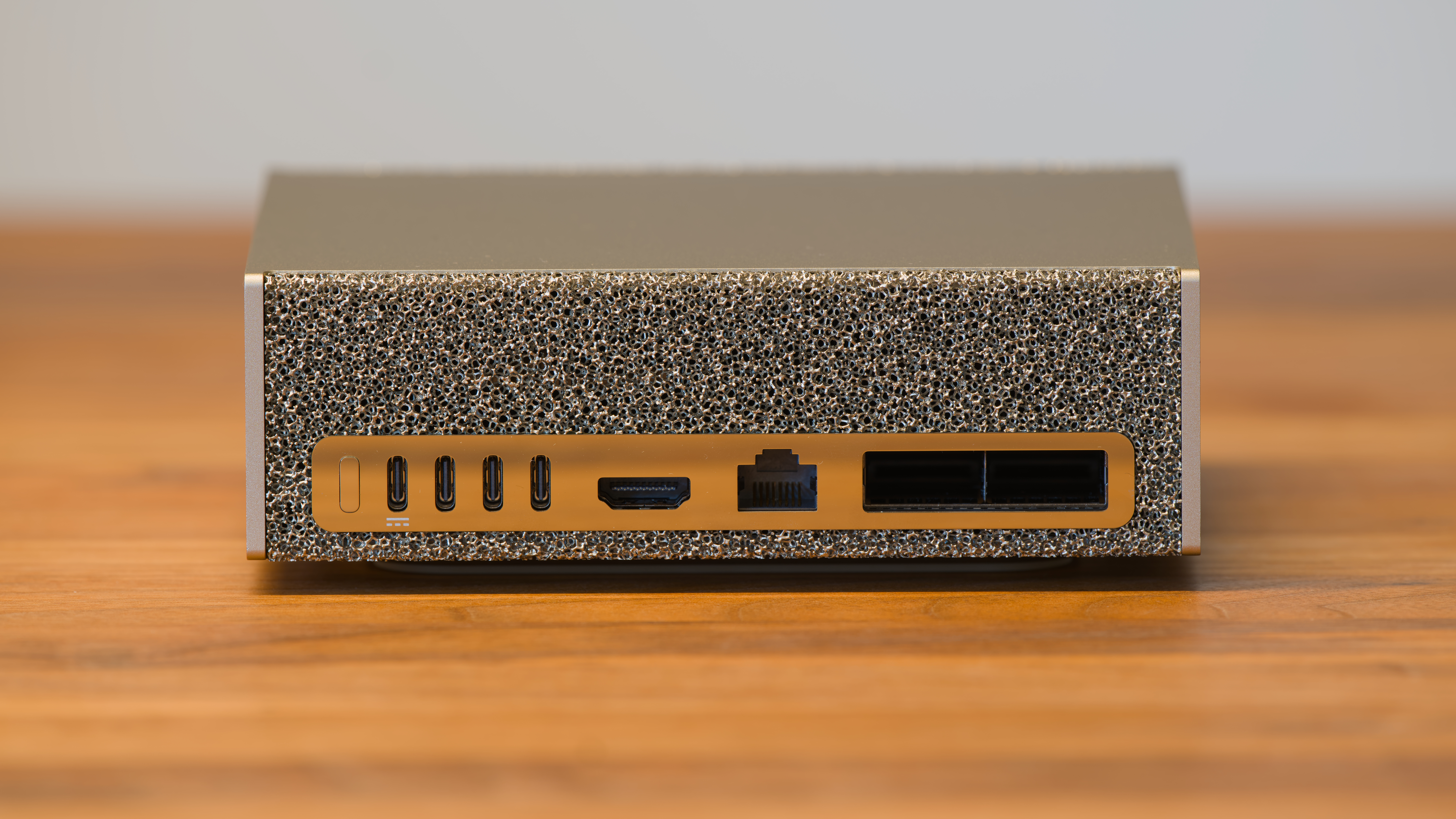
The rear of the NVIDIA DGX Spark features ConnectX-7 ports, shown here on the right side

Product names included:

- The ConnectX product family of multi-protocol ASICs and adapters supports virtual protocol interconnect (VPI), enabling support for both Ethernet and InfiniBand traffic at speeds up to 200 Gbit/s. The ConnectX-6, and ConnectX-6 Dx adapters have enhanced capabilities such as high speed (up to 200 Gb per second), OVS acceleration, Multi-Host support, and inline crypto acceleration.
- The ConnectX architecture has been described as "novel", with excellent performance that is "very well suited for modern multi-core platforms". The Quantum family of InfiniBand switches supports up to 40 ports running at HDR 200 Gbit/s. The Quantum switches offer un-matched latency and packet forwarding performance and support advanced HPC offloads including SHARP (collective operation acceleration) and SHIELD (self-healing) technologies.
- The Spectrum product family of Ethernet switches.
- The LinkX product family of cables and transceivers. These products are available for both Ethernet and InfiniBand protocols and various form factors.

=== High-performance computing ===
By 2011, Mellanox's InfiniBand products for computer clusters had been deployed in many of the TOP500 lists of high-performance computers.

=== Storage ===
Although originally associated with InfiniBand products, Mellanox was later able to use its technology for storage area networks (SANs), to replace legacy Fibre Channel for example with the much more common Ethernet family of standards, since 2011.

=== Operations ===
In addition to its headquarters in the US, Mellanox had offices in Israel, Denmark, China, Russia, Singapore, Taiwan, Japan and the United Kingdom.

== Support of the Palestinian Tech Economy ==
Mellanox outsourced some of its engineering to the West Bank. Rather than setting up offshore engineering centers in the Far East or Eastern Europe, Mellanox hired Palestinian engineers from Ramallah through a Palestinian outsourcing firm. In 2018, Waldman told a Tel Aviv conference hosted by Globes magazine that over 100 Palestinians are working on Mellanox projects.

Waldman had previously talked about Mellanox's plans to build a research and development center in Ramallah, even though it is more expensive than outsourcing to Eastern Europe.

== See also ==
- Israel-Palestinian high-tech initiatives
- List of Israeli companies listed on the Nasdaq
- Silicon Wadi
- Startup Village, Yokneam
- Economy of Israel
- Nvidia
