= InfiniBand =

Network standard

InfiniBand Trade Association
- Formation: 1999
- Type: Industry trade group
- Purpose: Promoting InfiniBand
- Headquarters: Beaverton, Oregon, U.S.
- Website: infinibandta.org

InfiniBand (IB) is a computer networking standard used in high-performance computing that features very high throughput and very low latency. It is used for data interconnect both among and within computers. InfiniBand is also used as either a direct or switched interconnect between servers and storage systems, as well as an interconnect between storage systems. It is designed to be scalable and uses a switched fabric network topology. Between 2014 and June 2016, it was the most commonly used interconnect in the TOP500 list of supercomputers.

Mellanox (acquired by Nvidia) manufactures InfiniBand host bus adapters and network switches, which are used by large computer system and database vendors in their product lines.

As a computer cluster interconnect, IB competes with Ethernet, Fibre Channel, and Intel Omni-Path. The technology is promoted by the InfiniBand Trade Association.

== History ==
InfiniBand originated in 1999 from the merger of two competing designs: Future I/O and Next Generation I/O (NGIO). NGIO was led by Intel, with a specification released in 1998, and joined by Sun Microsystems and Dell. Future I/O was backed by Compaq, IBM, and Hewlett-Packard. This led to the formation of the InfiniBand Trade Association (IBTA), which included both sets of hardware vendors as well as software vendors such as Microsoft. At the time it was thought some of the more powerful computers were approaching the interconnect bottleneck of the PCI bus, in spite of upgrades like PCI-X. Version 1.0 of the InfiniBand Architecture Specification was released in 2000. Initially the IBTA vision for IB was simultaneously a replacement for PCI in I/O, Ethernet in the machine room, cluster interconnect and Fibre Channel. IBTA also envisaged decomposing server hardware on an IB fabric.

Mellanox had been founded in 1999 to develop NGIO technology, but by 2001 shipped an InfiniBand product line called InfiniBridge at 10 Gbit/second speeds. Following the burst of the dot-com bubble there was hesitation in the industry to invest in such a far-reaching technology jump. By 2002, Intel announced that instead of shipping IB integrated circuits ("chips"), it would focus on developing PCI Express, and Microsoft discontinued IB development in favor of extending Ethernet. Sun Microsystems and Hitachi continued to support IB.

In 2003, the System X supercomputer built at Virginia Tech used InfiniBand in what was estimated to be the third largest computer in the world at the time. The OpenIB Alliance (later renamed OpenFabrics Alliance) was founded in 2004 to develop an open set of software for the Linux kernel. By February, 2005, the support was accepted into the 2.6.11 Linux kernel. In November 2005 storage devices finally were released using InfiniBand from vendors such as Engenio. Cisco, desiring to keep technology superior to Ethernet off the market, adopted a "buy to kill" strategy. Cisco successfully killed InfiniBand switching companies such as Topspin via acquisition.

Of the top 500 supercomputers in 2009, Gigabit Ethernet was the internal interconnect technology in 259 installations, compared with 181 using InfiniBand. In 2010, market leaders Mellanox and Voltaire merged, leaving just one other IB vendor, QLogic, primarily a Fibre Channel vendor. At the 2011 International Supercomputing Conference, links running at about 56 gigabits per second (known as FDR, see below), were announced and demonstrated by connecting booths in the trade show. In 2012, Intel acquired QLogic's InfiniBand technology, leaving only one independent supplier.

By 2014, InfiniBand was the most popular internal connection technology for supercomputers, although within two years, 10 Gigabit Ethernet started displacing it.

In 2016, it was reported that Oracle Corporation (an investor in Mellanox) might engineer its own InfiniBand hardware.

In 2019 Nvidia acquired Mellanox, the last independent supplier of InfiniBand products.

== Specification ==
Specifications are published by the InfiniBand trade association.

=== Performance ===
Original names for speeds were single-data rate (SDR), double-data rate (DDR) and quad-data rate (QDR) as given below. Subsequently, other three-letter initialisms were added for even higher data rates.

InfiniBand unidirectional data rates
	Year	Line code		Signaling rate (Gbit/s)	Throughput (Gbit/s)				Adapter latency (μs)
	Year	Line code		Signaling rate (Gbit/s)	1x	4x	8x	12x	Adapter latency (μs)
SDR	2001, 2003	NRZ	8b/10b	2.5	2	8	16	24	5
DDR	2005	NRZ	8b/10b	5	4	16	32	48	2.5
QDR	2007	NRZ	8b/10b	10	8	32	64	96	1.3
FDR10	2011	NRZ	64b/66b	10.3125	10	40	80	120	0.7
FDR	2011	NRZ	64b/66b	14.0625	13.64	54.54	109.08	163.64	0.7
EDR	2014	NRZ	64b/66b	25.78125	25	100	200	300	0.5
HDR	2018	PAM4	256b/257b (Note: Using Reed-Solomon forward error correction)	53.125	50	200	400	600	<0.6
NDR	2022	PAM4	256b/257b	106.25	100	400	800	1200	?
XDR	2024	PAM4	256b/257b	212.5	200	800	1600	2400	?
GDR	TBA			~ 425	400	1600	3200	4800	?
LDR	TBA			~ 850	800	3200	6400	9600	?

Notes

Each link is duplex. Links can be aggregated: most systems use a 4 link/lane connector (QSFP). HDR often makes use of 2x links (aka HDR100, 100 Gb link using 2 lanes of HDR, while still using a QSFP connector). NDR introduced OSFP connectors which host one or two links at 2x (NDR200) or 4x (NDR400). They are not logically configured as a single 8x link, even when connecting switches together with an OSFP cable.

InfiniBand provides remote direct memory access (RDMA) capabilities for low CPU overhead.

=== Topology ===
InfiniBand uses a switched fabric topology, as opposed to early shared medium Ethernet. All transmissions begin or end at a channel adapter. Each processor contains a host channel adapter (HCA) and each peripheral has a target channel adapter (TCA). These adapters can also exchange information for security or quality of service (QoS).

=== Messages ===
InfiniBand transmits data in packets of up to 4 KB that are taken together to form a message. A message can be:

- a remote direct memory access read or write
- a channel send or receive
- a transaction-based operation (that can be reversed)
- a multicast transmission
- an atomic operation

=== Physical interconnection ===
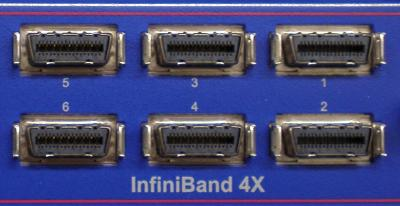
InfiniBand switch with CX4/SFF-8470 connectors

In addition to a board form factor connection, it can use both active and passive copper (up to 10 meters) and optical fiber cable (up to 10 km). QSFP connectors are used.

The InfiniBand Association also specified the CXP connector system for speeds up to 120 Gbit/s over copper, active optical cables, and optical transceivers using parallel multi-mode fiber cables with 24-fiber MPO connectors.

=== Software interfaces ===
Mellanox operating system support is available for Solaris, FreeBSD, Red Hat Enterprise Linux, SUSE Linux Enterprise Server (SLES), Windows, HP-UX, VMware ESX, and AIX.

InfiniBand has no specific standard application programming interface (API). The standard only lists a set of verbs such as ibv_open_device or ibv_post_send, which are abstract representations of functions or methods that must exist. The syntax of these functions is left to the vendors. Sometimes for reference this is called the verbs API. The de facto standard software is developed by OpenFabrics Alliance and called the Open Fabrics Enterprise Distribution (OFED). It is released under two licenses GPL2 or BSD license for Linux and FreeBSD, and as Mellanox OFED for Windows (product names: WinOF / WinOF-2; attributed as host controller driver for matching specific ConnectX 3 to 5 devices) under a choice of BSD license for Windows. It has been adopted by most of the InfiniBand vendors, for Linux, FreeBSD, and Microsoft Windows. IBM refers to a software library called libibverbs, for its AIX operating system, as well as "AIX InfiniBand verbs". The Linux kernel support was integrated in 2005 into the kernel version 2.6.11.

=== Ethernet over InfiniBand ===
Ethernet over InfiniBand, abbreviated to EoIB, is an Ethernet implementation over the InfiniBand protocol and connector technology. EoIB enables multiple Ethernet bandwidths varying on the InfiniBand (IB) version. Ethernet's implementation of the Internet Protocol Suite, usually referred to as TCP/IP, is different in some details compared to the direct InfiniBand protocol in IP over IB (IPoIB).

Ethernet over InfiniBand performance
Type	Lanes	Bandwidth (Gbit/s)	Compatible Ethernet type(s)	Compatible Ethernet quantity
SDR	1	2.5	GbE to 2.5 GbE	2 × GbE to 1 × 2.5 GbE
SDR	4	10	GbE to 10 GbE	10 × GbE to 1 × 10 GbE
SDR	8	20	GbE to 10 GbE	20 × GbE to 2 × 10 GbE
SDR	12	30	GbE to 25 GbE	30 × GbE to 1 × 25 GbE + 1 × 5 GbE
DDR	1	5	GbE to 5 GbE	5 × GbE to 1 × 5 GbE
DDR	4	20	GbE to 10 GbE	20 × GbE to 2 × 10 GbE
DDR	8	40	GbE to 40 GbE	40 × GbE to 1 × 40 GbE
DDR	12	60	GbE to 50 GbE	60 × GbE to 1 × 50 GbE + 1 × 10 GbE
QDR	1	10	GbE to 10 GbE	10 × GbE to 1 × 10 GbE
QDR	4	40	GbE to 40 GbE	40 × GbE to 1 × 40 GbE

== See also ==
- 100 Gigabit Ethernet
- iSCSI Extensions for RDMA
- iWARP
- List of interface bit rates
- Optical communication
- Parallel optical interface
- SCSI RDMA Protocol
