= IBM SAN Volume Controller =

Storage virtualisation appliance

The IBM SAN Volume Controller (SVC) is a block storage virtualization appliance that belongs to the IBM System Storage product family. SVC implements an indirection, or "virtualization", layer in a Fibre Channel storage area network (SAN).

== Architecture ==
The IBM 2145 SAN Volume Controller (SVC) is an inline virtualization or "gateway" device. It logically sits between hosts and storage arrays, presenting itself to hosts as the storage provider (target) and presenting itself to storage arrays as one big host. SVC is physically attached to one or several SAN fabrics.

The virtualization approach allows for non-disruptive replacements of any part in the storage infrastructure, including the SVC devices themselves. It also aims at simplifying compatibility requirements in strongly heterogeneous server and storage landscapes. All advanced functions are therefore implemented in the virtualization layer, which allows switching storage array vendors without impact. Finally, spreading an SVC installation across two or more sites (stretched clustering) enables basic disaster protection paired with continuous availability.

SVC nodes are always clustered, with a minimum of 2 and a maximum of 8 nodes, and linear scalability. Nodes are rack-mounted appliances derived from IBM System x servers, protected by redundant power supplies and integrated batteries. Earlier models featured external battery-backed power supplies. Each node has Fibre Channel ports simultaneously used for incoming, outgoing, and intracluster data traffic. Hosts may also be attached via FCoE and iSCSI Gbit Ethernet ports. Intracluster communication includes maintaining read/write cache integrity, sharing status information, and forwarding reads and writes to any port. These ports must be zoned together.

Write cache is protected by mirroring within a pair of SVC nodes, called I/O group. Virtualized resources (= storage volumes presented to hosts) are distributed across I/O groups to improve performance. Volumes can also be moved nondisruptively between I/O groups, e.g., when new node pairs are added or older technology is removed. Node pairs are always active, meaning both members accept simultaneous writes for each volume. In addition, all other cluster nodes accept and forward read and write requests which are internally handled by the appropriate I/O group. Path or board failures are compensated by non-disruptive failover within each I/O group, or optionally across dispersed I/O groups. Hosts must have multipath drivers installed, such as IBM Subsystem Device Driver (SDD) or standard MPIO drivers.

SVC is based on COMmodity PArts Storage System (Compass) architecture, developed at the IBM Almaden Research Center. The majority of the software has been developed at the IBM Hursley Labs in the UK.

== Terminology ==
- Node - a single 1U or 2U machine.

SVC node models
Type-model	Cache [GB]	FC speed [Gb/s]	iSCSI Speed [Gb/s]	Based upon	Announced
2145-4F2	4	2	n/a	x335	2 June 2003
2145-8F2	8	2	1	x336	25 October 2005
2145-8F4	8	4	1	x336	23 May 2006
2145-8G4	8	4	1	x3550	22 May 2007
2145-8A4	8	4	1	x3250M2	28 October 2008
2145-CF8	24	8	1	x3550M2	20 October 2009
2145-CG8	24	8	1 (10 Gbit/s optional)	x3550M3	9 May 2011
2145-DH8	32	8 & 16	1 (10 Gbit/s optional)	x3650M4	6 May 2014
2145-SV1	64...256	16	10 Gbit/s	Xeon E5 v4	23 August 2016
2147-SV1	64...256	16	10 Gbit/s	Xeon E5 v4	23 August 2016

- I/O group - a pair of nodes that duplicate each other's write commands
- Cluster - a group of 1 to 4 I/O groups managed as a single entity.
  - Stretched cluster - a site protection configuration with 1 to 4 I/O groups, each stretched across two sites, plus a witness site
  - Cluster IP address - a single IP address of a cluster that provides administrative interfaces via (SSH and HTTPS)
  - Service IP address - an IP address used to service an individual node. Each node can have a service IP configured.
  - Configuration node - a single node that holds the cluster's configuration and has the assigned cluster IP address.
- Master Console (or SSPC) - a management GUI for SVC until rel 5.1, based on WebSphere Application Server; not installed on any SVC node, but on a separate machine
  - As of SVC rel 6.1, a Master Console (SSPC) is no longer used. Web based administration is done directly on the configuration node, using a HTML5 GUI.
- Virtual Disk (VDisk) - a unit of storage presented to the host. The release 6 GUI refers to a VDisk as a Volume.
- Managed Disk (MDisk) - a unit of storage (a LUN) from a real, external disk array, virtualized by the SVC. An MDisk is the base to create an image mode VDisk.
- Managed Disk Group - (MDisk Group) a group of one or more Mdisks. The extents of the MDisks in an MDisk Group are the base to create a striped or sequential mode VDisk. The release 6 GUI refers to a Managed Disk Group as a Pool.
- Extent - a discrete unit of storage; an MDisk is divided into extents; a VDisk is formed from set of extents.

== Timeline ==
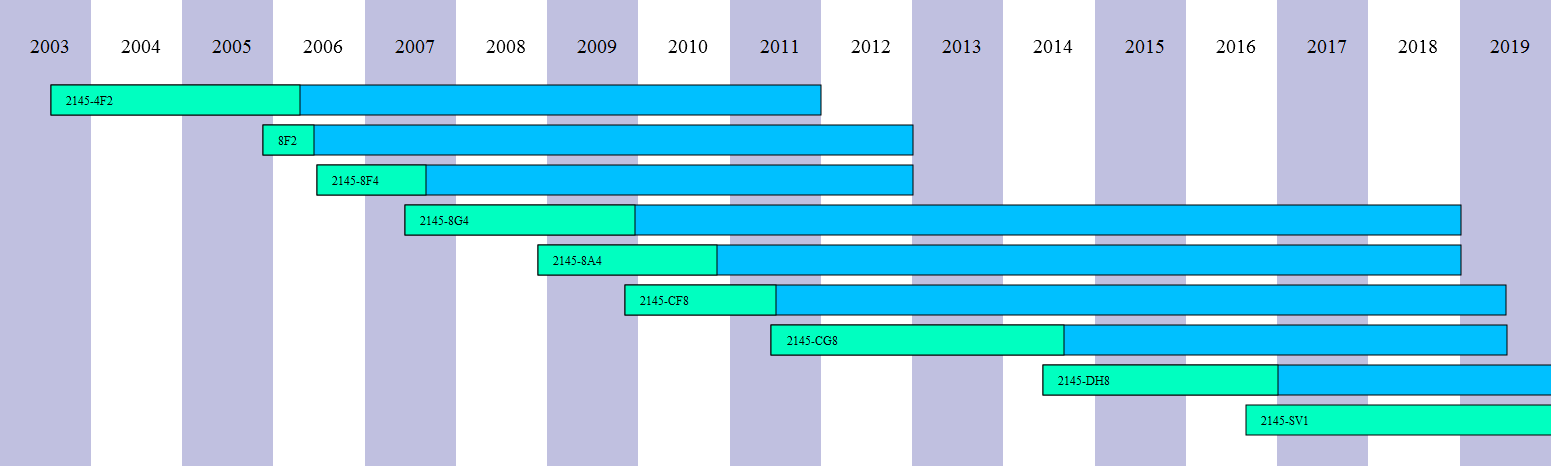
Timeline for IBM SAN Volume Controller until August 2019

The different SAN Volume Controller models were available for purchase shortly after the mentioned announcement day. The light green bars show the period of time when each model could be ordered, while the light blue bars show how long the standard service was continued after withdrawal from marketing. The displayed information is current in August 2019. There are differences in service conditions between 2145 and 2147, but not in hardware.

== Performance ==
Release 4.3 of the SVC held the Storage Performance Council (SPC) world record for SPC-1 performance benchmarks, returning nearly 275K (274,997.58) IOPS. There was no faster storage subsystem benchmarked by the SPC at that time (October 2008). The SPC-2 benchmark also returned a world leading measurement of over 7 GB/s throughput.

Release 5.1 achieved new records with a 4 node and 6 node cluster benchmark with DS8700 as backed storage device. SVC broke its own record of 274,997.58 SPC-1 IOPS in March 2010, with 315,043.59 for the 4 node cluster and 380,489.30 with the 6 node cluster, records that stood until October 2011.

Release 6.2 of the SVC held the Storage Performance Council (SPC) world record for SPC-1 performance benchmarks, returning over 500K (520,043.99) IOPS (I/Os per second) using 8 SVC nodes and Storwize V7000 as the backend disk. There was no faster storage subsystem benchmarked by the SPC at that time (January 2012). The full results and executive summaries can be reviewed at the SPC website referenced above. (Note: "Cache hit" or "bandwidth" performance numbers are usually much higher, e.g. "20 GBPS", but are relatively meaningless as they cannot be achieved in real-word scenarios.)

Release 7.x provides multiple enhancements including support for additional CPUs, cache and adapters. The streamlined cache operates at 100μs fall-through latency and 60 μs cache-hit latency, enabling SVC as a front-end to IBM FlashSystem solid-state storage without significant performance penalty. (See also: FlashSystem V9000).

== Included Features (7.x) ==
Indirection or mapping from virtual LUN to physical LUN
Servers access SVC as if it were a storage controller. The SCSI LUNs they see represent virtual disks (volumes) allocated in SVC from a pool of storage made up from one or more managed disks (MDisks). A managed disk is simply a storage LUN provided by one of the storage controllers that SVC is virtualizing. The virtual capacity can be larger than the managed physical capacity, with a current maximum of 32 PB, depending on management granularity (extent size)
Data migration and pooling
SVC can move volumes from one capacity pool (MDisk group) to another whilst maintaining I/O access to the data. Write and read caching remain active. Pools can be shrunk or expanded by removing or adding hardware capacity, while maintaining I/O access to the data. Both features can be used for seamless hardware migration. Migration from an old SVC model to the most recent model is also seamless and implies no copying of data.
Importing and exporting existing LUNs via Image Mode
"Image mode" is a non-virtualized pass-through representation of an MDisk (managed LUN) that contains existing client data; such an MDisk can be seamlessly imported into or removed from an SVC cluster.
Fast-write cache
Writes from hosts are acknowledged once they have been committed into the SVC mirrored cache, but prior to being destaged to the underlying storage controllers. Data is protected by replication to the peer node in an I/O group (cluster node pair). Cache size is dependent on the SVC hardware model and installed options. Fast-write cache is especially useful to increase performance in midrange storage configurations.
Auto tiering (Easy Tier)
SVC automatically selects the best storage hardware for each chunk of data, according to its access patterns. Cache unfriendly "hot" data is dynamically moved to solid state drives SSD, whereas cache friendly data as well as "cold" data is moved to economic spinning disks. Easy Tier also monitors and optimizes spindle-only workloads if no solid state storage is attached. Idem, Easy Tier automatically optimizes solid-state workloads between Enterprise- and Read Intensive Flash media.
Solid state drive (SSD) capability
SVC can use any supported external SSD storage device or provide its own internal SSD slots, up to 32 per cluster. These can be used to boost aging spinning disk pools: Easy Tiering is automatically active in hybrid mixed-media capacity pools.
Thin Provisioning
LUN capacity is only used when new data is written to a LUN. Data blocks equal zero are not physically allocated, unless previous data unequal zero exists. During import or during internal migrations, data blocks equal zero are discarded (Thick-to-thin migration).
Besides, thin provisioning is integrated in the FlashCopy features detailed below to provide space-efficient snapshots
Virtual Disk Mirroring
Provides the ability to maintain two redundant copies of a LUN, implicitly on different storage controllers
Site protection with Stretched Cluster
A geographically distributed, highly available clustered storage setup leveraging the virtual disk mirroring feature across datacenters within 300 km distance. Stretched Clusters can span 2, 3 or 4 datacenters (chain or ring topology, a 4-site cluster requiring 8 cluster nodes). Cluster consistency is ensured by a majority voting set.
From two storage devices in two datacenters, SVC presents one common logical instance. User-side operations like Snapshot or LUN Resizing apply at the logical instance level. Hardware-oriented operations like real-time compression or live hardware migration occur at the physical instance level.
Unlike in classical mirroring, logical LUNs are readable and writable on both sides (tandem) at the same time, removing the need for failover, role switch, or site switch as found in Site Recovery managing products. The feature can be combined with Live Partition Mobility or VMotion to avoid bulk data transport during a metro-distance virtual server motion.
Geographical crossover access
All SVC cluster nodes in a Stretched Cluster have read/write access to storage hardware in the mirror location, removing the need for site-resynchronization in case of single node failures. This feature is mutually exclusive with Enhanced Stretched Cluster, and only recommended for single stretched node pairs.
Hot Standby Nodes
Powered nodes that can take over the role of failed nodes in a stretched or local cluster at very short notice.
Enhanced Stretched Cluster
A functionality optimizing data paths within a metro- or geo-distance Stretched Cluster (see above), helpful when bandwidth between sites is scarce and cross-site traffic must be minimized. SVC will attempt to use the shortest path for reads and writes. For instance, cache write destaging to storage devices is always performed by the most nearby cache copy, unless its peer cache copy is down. Two node pairs are the recommended minimum for an Enhanced Stretched Cluster.
Stretched Cluster with golden copy (3-site DR)
A Stretched Cluster that maintains an additional synchronous or asynchronous data copy on an independent Stretched Cluster or SVC or Storwize device at geo distances. The golden copy is a disaster protection against metro-scale outages impacting the Stretched Cluster as a whole. It relies on licensed Metro- or Global Mirror functionality.
Hyperswap
The ability to seamlessly fail over data access between geographically dispersed IO groups or clusters. As with Stretched Cluster, both sides accept simultaneous writes, but write cache data is mirrored locally in both sites as IO groups are kept together. Hyperswap can be combined with Live Partition Mobility or VMotion for maximized application availability. On the server side, Hyperswap works with most native multipath drivers with ALUA support. Hyperswap relies on Metro Mirror functionality and requires a Metro Mirror license, as well as a minimum of two node pairs.
Transparent Cloud Tiering
Swift- and S3-compatible object datastores can be used as a cold tier for incremental volume snapshots and volume archives without live production access. This allows keeping hourly time machine copies or archiving VM images including attached volumes at a price point somewhat closer to tape media. On-premise datastore support is provided via OpenStack Swift. Off-premise datastore support is provided by Amazon S3 or Softlayer. Off-premise Transparent Cloud Tiering per default uses AES encryption, which is a licensed feature.

=== Optional features ===
There are some optional features, separately licensed e.g. per TB:

Real-Time Compression
This in-flight data reduction technology offers a footprint reduction of 50% (guaranteed) or up to 80% (found in Oracle databases). Leveraging dedicated compression hardware, it has generally no performance impact and is usable for heavy duty databases. The temporal locality of the algorithm can even increase the read performance on adequate data patterns such as SQL databases stored on spinning disks. The compression efficiency is equal to "zip" (Lempel–Ziv–Welch) with a very large dictionary, and can accurately be predicted across Petabytes using the Comprestimator tool.
Real-Time Compression can be combined with Easy Tiering, Thin Provisioning and Virtual Disk Mirroring. It was initially invented by the acquired startup Storwize Inc., which also served as new name for the SVC-derived IBM storage systems family.
FlashCopy (Snapshot)
This is used to create a disk snapshot for backup/rollback or application testing of a single volume. Snapshots require only the "delta" capacity unless created with full-provisioned target volumes. FlashCopy comes in three flavours: Snapshot, Backup volume, and Clone, which is automatically unlinked from its source. All are based on optimized copy-on-write technology.
One source volume can have up to 256 simultaneous targets. Targets can be made incremental, and cascaded tree like dependency structures can be constructed. Targets can be re-applied to their source or any other appropriate volume, also of different size (e.g. resetting any changes from a resize command).
Copy-on-write is based on a bitmap with a configurable grain size, as opposed to a journal.
FlashCopy rollback (time machine)
Provides a time-machine inspired rollback capability using selectively granular consistency points. The consistency mechanism can cover many LUNs at a time. Rollback requires a FlashCopy license and the Spectrum Control Snapshot software.
Metro Mirror - synchronous remote replication
This allows a remote disaster recovery site at a distance of up to about 300km
Global Mirror - asynchronous remote replication
This allows a remote disaster recovery site at a distance of thousands of kilometres. Each Global Mirror relationship can be configured for high latency / low bandwidth or for high latency / high bandwidth connectivity, the latter allowing a consistent recovery point objective RPO below 1 sec.
Global Mirror over IP - remote replication over the Internet
uses SANslide technology integrated into the SVC firmware to send mirroring data traffic across a TCP/IP link, while maximizing the bandwidth efficiency of that link. This may result in a 100x data transfer acceleration over long distances.
Encryption of data at rest
SVC and other Spectrum Virtualize-based devices can transparently encrypt data on any local media, virtualized attached storage, or cloud tier (per default). The encryption mechanism is 256-bit AES-XTS. Keys are either generated locally and stored on removable thumb drives or obtained from a key lifecycle management service. Both options are mutually exclusive.

== Other products running SVC code ==
On 7 October 2010, IBM announced the IBM Storwize V7000, the first member of the Storwize family. Storwize uses the SAN Volume Controller code base with internal storage to provide a mid-price storage subsystem. The IBM Storwize V5000, V3700 and V3500 are shrunk compatible models with less cache/CPU/adapters and a reduced set of features.

The IBM FlashSystem V9000 leverages the SVC firmware integrated with IBM FlashSystem solid-state drawers.

In 2015, IBM re-badged the virtualization functionality as Spectrum Virtualize, in order to align it with the IBM software-defined storage naming conventions and to highlight the interoperability aspect.

=== Non-IBM products running SVC code ===
The Actifio Protection and Availability Storage (PAS) appliance includes elements of SVC code to achieve wide interoperability. The PAS platform spans backup, disaster recovery, and business continuity among other functions.

== See also ==
- IBM Subsystem Device Driver (SDD), a multipathing driver for IBM System Storage, originally used by IBM Enterprise Storage Server
- EMC VPLEX, a competing solution
- IBM Storwize family
