= PureSystems =

Family of computer systems

IBM PureSystems
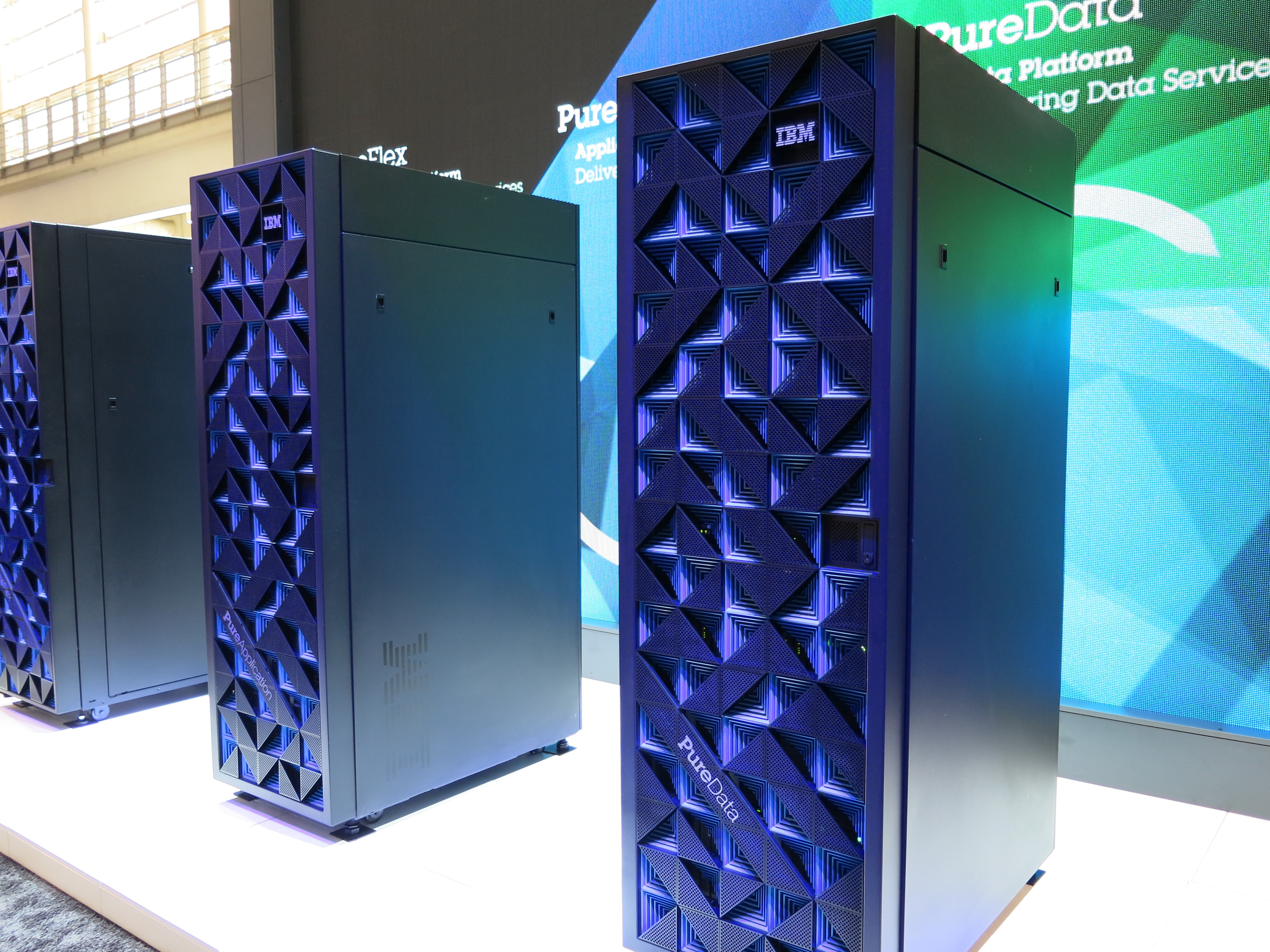
- IBM PureSystems racks
- Developer: IBM
- Type: converged system
- Released: 2012.04.11; 13 years ago
- CPU: x86 or IBM POWER
- Related: IBM FlashSystem; IBM Flex System; IBM Storwize

PureSystems is an IBM product line of factory pre-configured components and servers also being referred to as an "Expert Integrated System". The centrepiece of PureSystems is the IBM Flex System Manager in tandem with the so-called "Patterns of Expertise" for the automated configuration and management of PureSystems.

PureSystems can host four different operating systems (AIX, IBM i, Linux, Windows) and five hypervisors (Hyper-V, KVM, PowerVM, VMware, Xen) on two different instruction set architectures: Power ISA and x86. PureSystems is marketed as a converged system, which packages multiple information technology components into a single product.

== Architecture ==
The architecture itself is called IBM Flex System.

It aims at managing hybrid cloud infrastructure environments "out of the box".

The basic intention is for the combination of integrated hardware and software that can be easily maintained. A similar concept had already been introduced with the IBM AS/400. Today, such systems are called converged systems. More specialized integrated hardware and software are referred to as appliances.

The compute nodes of the server blades can be x86 or Power ISA and they can be used either individually or mixed in the same rack simultaneously, thus offering a hybrid ensemble which borrows from the zEnterprise/zBX ensemble (cf. a gameframe), including its ability to manage a combined physical/virtual hybrid environment from a single console.

PureSystems is shipped with the IBM Flex System Manager. It is an appliance which manages the resources according to the so-called "Patterns of Expertise", which provide field engineers' expertise from decades of system configuration. These "Patterns of Expertise" offer industry-specific (e.g. banking, insurance, automotive) defaults for the fully automatic and optimal orchestration of resources (e.g. workload balancing). PureApplication uses in conjunction with the IBM System Manager first Flex repeatable software patterns (pattern) and industry-specific processes, which are derived from the year-long collaboration of IBM with their customers and business partners.

== Platform ==
The basic building block of the system is the 10U high Flex Enterprise system chassis with 14 bays in the front for compute nodes ("servers") and storage nodes. Additionally, there are bays in the rear for I/O modules.

A flex-chassis can accommodate up to 14 horizontal compute and storage nodes in the front, and 4 vertically oriented switch modules in the rear. Contrasting to this, the IBM BladeCenter (9U high) has vertically oriented compute nodes ("blades"). This means that the components between the BladeCenter chassis and Flex chassis are not interchangeable.

Based upon the Flex Systems architecture (the components of which are individually available), there are three main products:

- PureFlex System (IaaS)
- PureApplication System (PaaS)
- PureData System (tightly coupled and specialized computer appliance / software appliance)

=== PureFlex ===
PureFlex is a factory pre-configured and combined hardware-/software system for IaaS in terms of cloud computing. It combines server, network and storage. IBM PureFlex is available in three configurations: Express, Standard, Enterprise.

	Express	Standard	Enterprise
IBM PureFlex System 42U Rack	1		
IBM Flex System Enterprise Chassis	1		
IBM Flex System Fabric EN4093 10Gb Scalable Switch	1		2 with both port-count upgrades
IBM Flex System FC3171 8Gb SAN Switch	1	2	
IBM Flex System Manager Node	1		
IBM Flex System Manager software license	IBM Flex System Manager with 1-year service and support	IBM Flex System Manager Advanced with 3-year service and support	
Chassis Management Module	2		
2500W power supply modules (equ./max.)	2 / 6	4 / 6	6 / 6
Chassis 80 mm fan modules (equ./max.)	4 / 8	6 / 8	8 / 8
IBM Storwize V7000 Disk System	Yes (redundant controller)		
IBM Storwize V7000 Software	Base with 1-year software maintenance agreement	Base with 3-year software maintenance agreement	

=== PureApplication ===
PureApplication is a pre-configured platform for platform as a service applications. It is optimized for transaction-oriented web and database applications. PureApplication comes with IBM Db2 database and WebSphere Application Server pre-configured so users can run their applications into a preconfigured middleware engine.

Unlike PureFlex, which is sold by IBM Systems and Technology Group (STG), PureApplication is marketed by the IBM Software Group (SWG). IBM claims that PureApplication allows for installation (or deployment) of new applications within four hours.

The system's virtual pattern deployers encrypt on-disk data using Security First Corp's SPxBitFiler-IPS encryption technology, which is also licensed by IBM for its Cloud Data Encryption Service (ICDES).

IBM PureApplication System is available in three classes:

- W1500-32 and W1500-64, using Intel Xeon E5-2670 processors, housed in a 25U rack
- W1500-96 through to W1500-608, using Intel Xeon E5-2670 processors, housed in a 42U rack
- W1700-96 through to W1700-608, using IBM POWER7+ processors, housed in a 42U rack

Intel Xeon E5-2670	System W1500-32	System W1500-64	System W1500-96	System W1500-192	System W1500-384	System W1500-608
Cores	32	64	96	192	384	608
RAM	0.5 TB	1.0 TB	1.5 TB	3.1 TB	6.1 TB	9.7 TB
SSD Storage	2.4 TB		6.4 TB			
HDD Storage	24.0 TB		48.0 TB			
Application Services Entitlement	Included					

IBM POWER7+	System W1700-32	System W1700-64	System W1700-96	System W1700-192	System W1700-384	System W1700-608
Cores	32	64	96	192	384	608
RAM	0.5 TB	1.0 TB	1.5 TB	3.1 TB	6.1 TB	9.7 TB
SSD Storage	2.4 TB		6.4 TB			
HDD Storage	24.0 TB		48.0 TB			
Application Services Entitlement	Included					

=== PureData ===
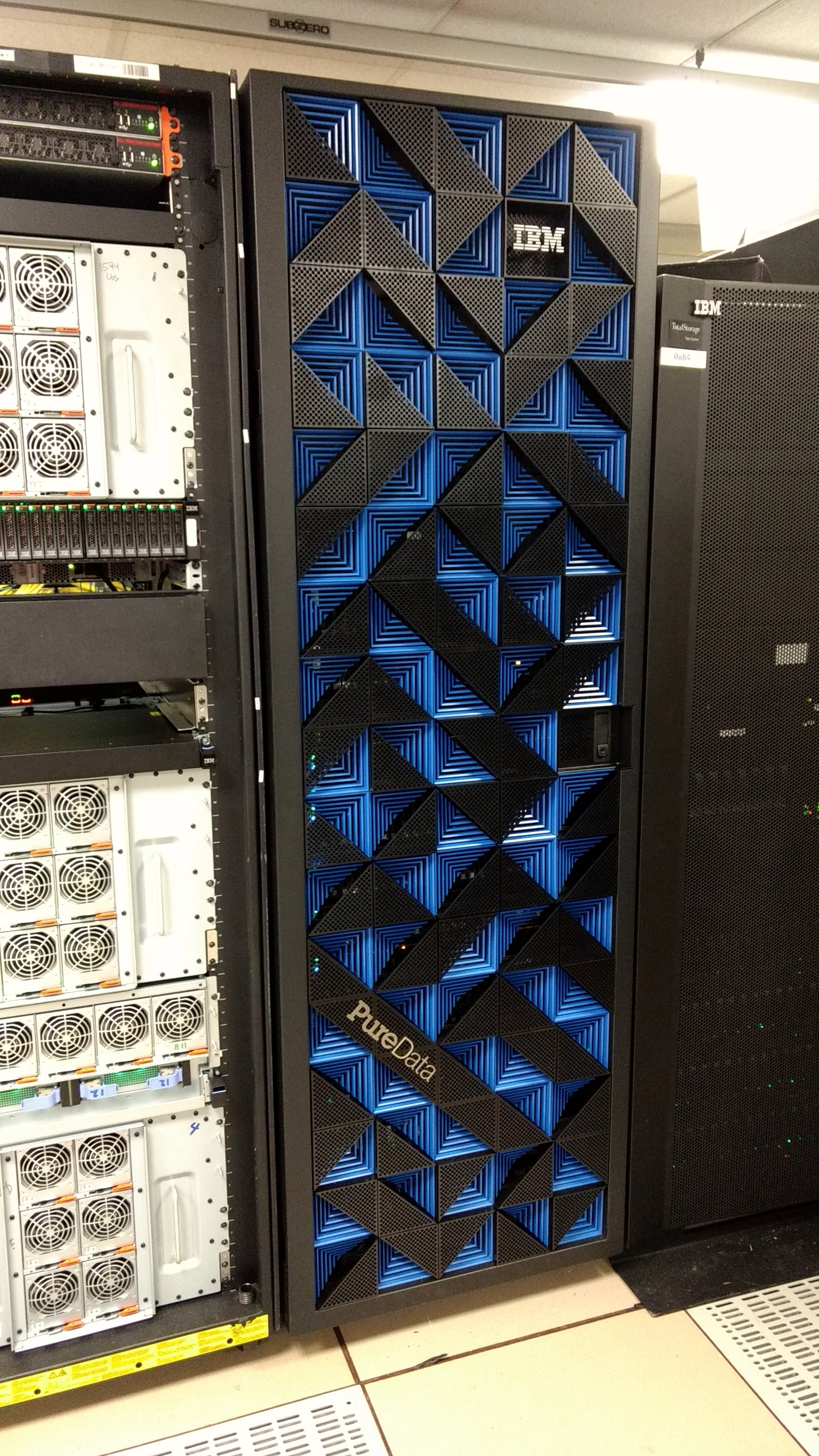
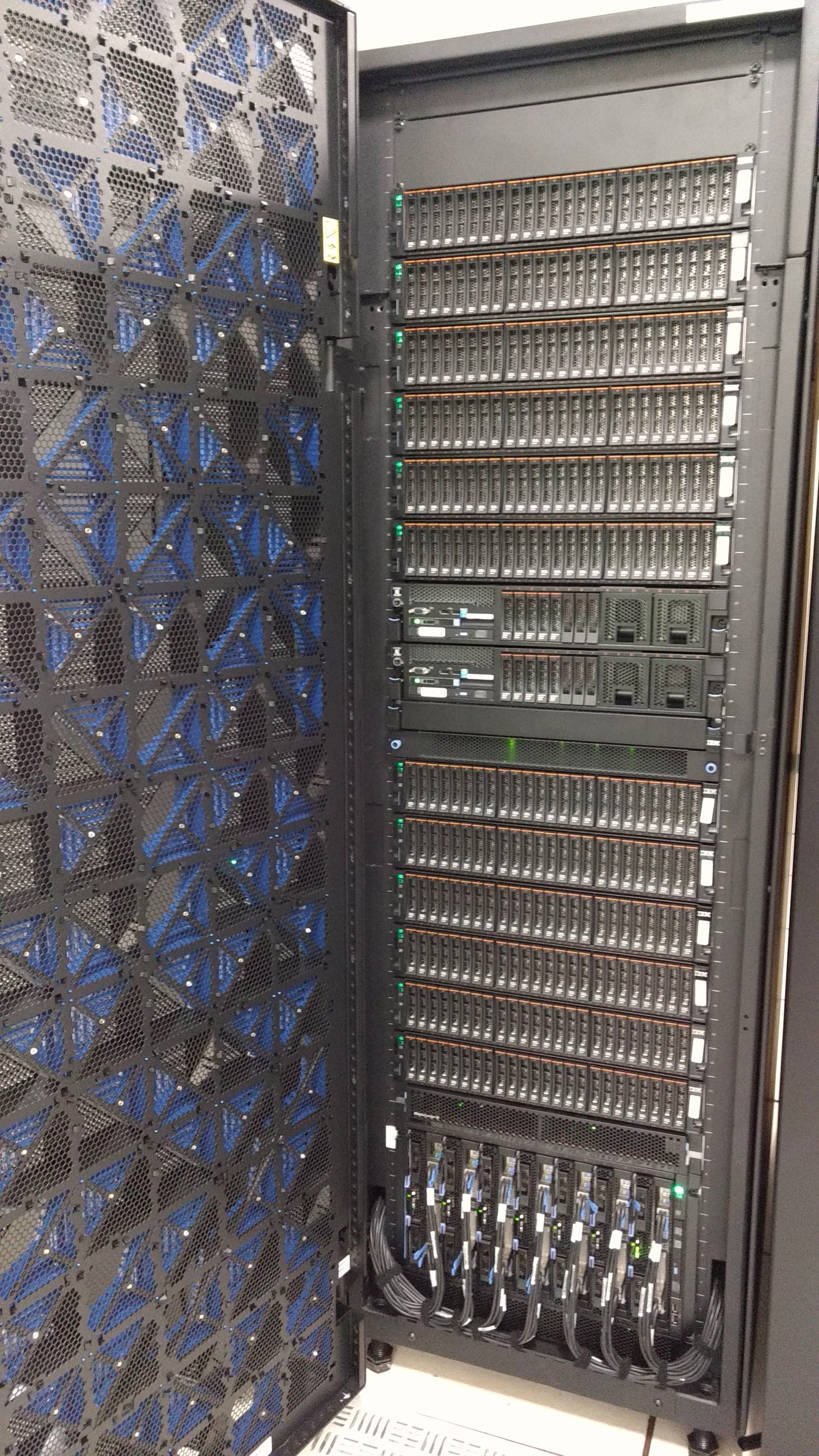
IBM PureData server (open and closed)

PureData Systems takes the approach of PureApplication a step further being essentially a tightly coupled and specialized computer appliance and software appliance, the latter supporting both Oracle and DB2. It is thence marketed by the IBM Information Management Software, a brand of IBM Software Group (SWG).

PureData is focused at three main tasks within enterprise computing: business intelligence, near real-time data analysis and online transactional processing. It comes in four flavours:

- PureData Systems for Transactions
- PureData Systems for Analytics
- PureData Systems for Operational Analytics
- PureData Systems for Hadoop

PureData System for Transactions is a database platform that is aimed at e-commerce (i.e. retail and credit card processing environments) which depends on rapid handling of transactions and interactions. These transactions are small in size, but their volume and frequency require a specialized environment. The new system can have a 5 times performance improvement.

PureData System for Analytics builds on Netezza technology and it is aimed at business intelligence that entails huge queries with complex algorithms. It provides a large library of database analytical functions for data warehouse applications, and can scale across the terabyte or petabytes running on the system. It can support extremely high volume high speed analytics for clients (e.g. mobile phone carriers who want to identify potential churn and provide offers to retain customers).

PureData Systems for Operational Analytics is an operational warehouse system which supports real-time decision making. In contrast to PureData System for Analytics, which is aimed at handling large sets of data at a time, PureData for Operational Analytics is more or less a stream computing system that can analyze many small sets of data in real-time while PureData for Analytics will provide analysis only in hindsight, although with large sets of data. Potential uses of PureData Systems for Operational Analytics are fraud detection or analysis of rapid fluctuations in supply-and-demand cycles.

PureData Systems for Hadoop H 1001 is a standards-based - so-called expert integrated - system which architecturally integrates IBM InfoSphere BigInsights, Hadoop-based software, server (IBM System x), and storage into a single appliance. Moreover, it integrates with IBM DB2, IBM Netezza, IBM PureData System for Analytics, and IBM InfoSphere Guardium.

== Hardware ==
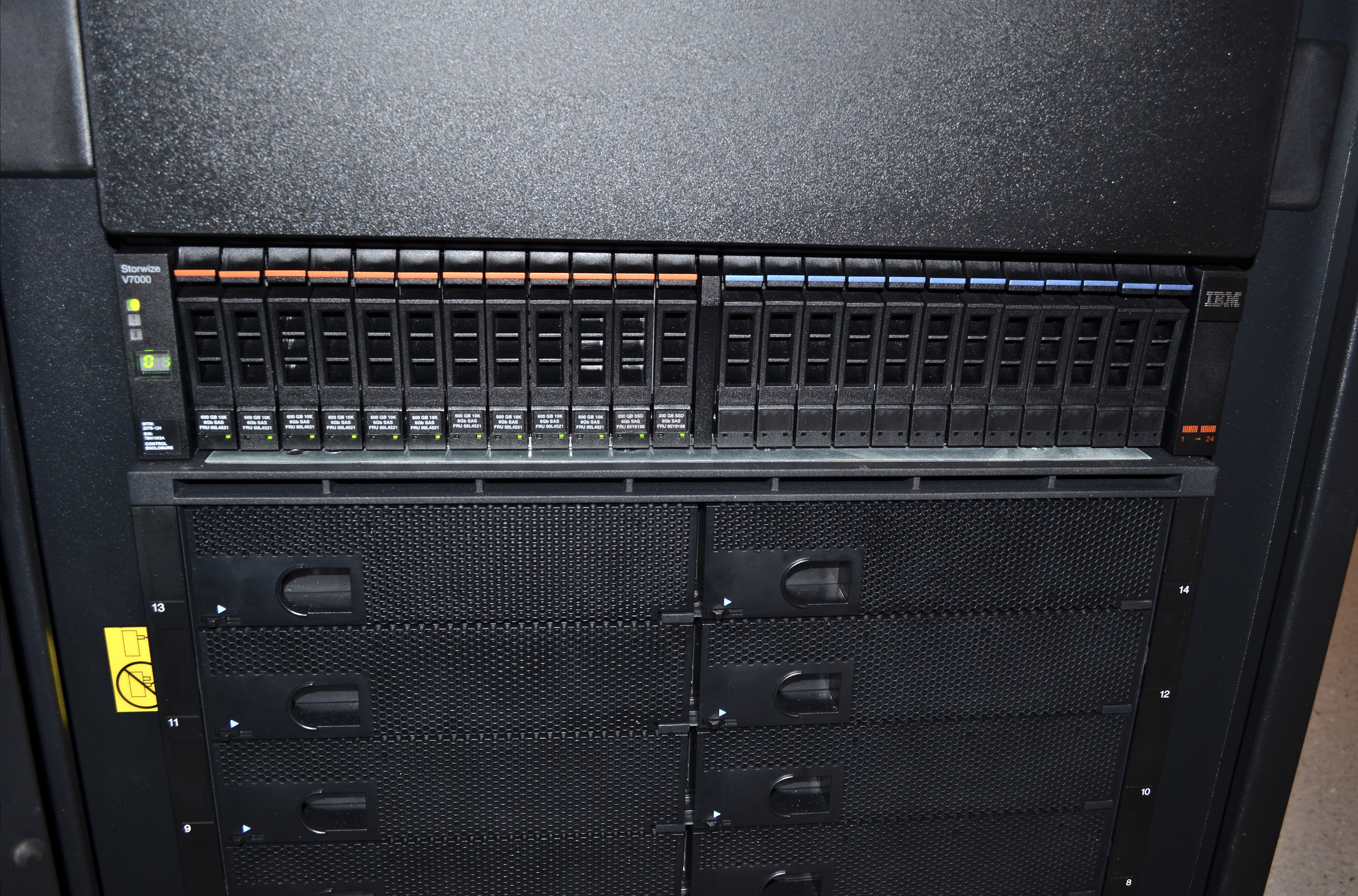
IBM PureFlex internals: Flex System blade enclosure (visible nodes empty) and IBM Storwize 7000 on top

=== Compute Nodes ===
==== Intel based ====
Compute nodes based on x86 processors from Intel.

===== x220 =====
- Flex System x220 compute node Type 7906
- Standard-width compute node
- Processors: Xeon E5-2400

===== x222 =====
- Flex System x220 compute node Type 7916
- Half-width compute node
- Processors: E5-2400

===== x240 =====
- Flex System x240 compute node Type 7162, 8737
- Standard-width compute node
- Processors: Type 7162: E5-2600 v2; Type 8737: E5-2600 v2 or E5-2600

===== x240 M5 =====
- Flex System x240 M5 compute node Type 9532
- Standard-width compute node
- Processors: E5-2600 v4

===== x440 =====
- Flex System x440 compute node Type 7167, 7917
- Double-width compute node
- Processors: Type 7917: Xeon E5-4600; Type 7167: E5-4600 v2

===== x280 X6, x480 X6, and x880 X6 =====
- IBM Flex System x280 X6, x480 X6, and x880 X6 compute nodes Type 7196, 7903
- Double-width compute node
- Processors:
  - x280 X6 Type 7903: Xeon E7-2800 v2
  - x480 X6 Type 7903: Xeon E7-4800 v2; Type 7196: Xeon E7-4800 v3
  - x880 X6 Type 7903: Xeon E7-8800 v2; Type 7196: Xeon E7-8800 v3
- Scalability:
  - x280 X6: Does not scale
  - x480 X6: Scales up to 4-socket by adding one x480 Compute Node + 4S scalability kit
  - x880 X6: Scales up to 4-socket by adding one x880 Compute Node + 4S scalability kit; up to 8-socket by adding three x880 Compute Nodes + 8S scalability kit

==== Power based ====
Compute nodes based on Power ISA-based processors from IBM.

===== p24L =====
- IBM Flex System p24L Compute Node: 1457-7FL
- Standard-width compute node
- Processors: Two IBM POWER7
- 16 DIMM sockets
- 512 GB using 16x 32 GB DIMMs maximum memory size
- Two I/O connectors for adapters. PCIe 2.0 x16 interface

===== p260 =====
- IBM Flex System p260 Compute Node: 7895-22X, 23A, and 23X
- Standard-width compute node
- Processors: Two IBM POWER7 (model 22X) or POWER7+ (models 23A and 23X)
- 16 DIMM sockets
- 512 GB using 16x 32 GB DIMMs maximum memory size
- Two I/O connectors for adapters. PCIe 2.0 x16 interface

===== p270 =====
- IBM Flex System p270 Compute Node: 7954-24X
- Standard-width compute node
- Processors: Two IBM POWER7+
- 16 DIMM sockets
- 512 GB using 16x 32 GB DIMMs maximum memory size
- Two I/O connectors for adapters. PCIe 2.0 x16 interface

===== p460 =====
- IBM Flex System p460 Compute Node: 7895-42X and 43X
- Double-width compute node
- Processors: Four IBM POWER7 (model 42X) or POWER7+ (model 43X)
- 32 DIMM sockets
- 1 TB using 32x 32 GB DIMMs maximum memory size
- Four I/O connectors for adapters. PCIe 2.0 x16 interface

== Software ==
Both IBM and its partners provide software which is specifically certified for PureSystems ("Ready for IBM PureSystems ").

Currently, over 125 ISVs have already certified products for PureSystems, and business partners such as system integrators, resellers, distributors, ISVs or MSP can integrate PureSystems into their portfolio.

== Miscellaneous ==
PureSystems was announced April 11, 2012.

It was mainly assembled at IBM Rochester Campus in Rochester, MN. But on March 6, 2013, IBM decided to shift production of Power Systems, PureSystems and PureFlex Systems servers to Guadalajara, Mexico from Rochester, Minnesota. After 2014, most systems will be assembled in Mexico.

== Videos ==
- IBM PureSystems Family Tour with Jason McGee
- What are IBM PureApplication Systems? (Part One)
- IBM PureSystems Product Family - IBM PureData™ System Overview
- IBM PureSystems - PureData System Overview w/Inhi Cho Suh

== See also ==
- List of IBM products
- IBM AS/400
- System p
- System x
- System z
