= Logical disk =

A logical disk, logical volume or virtual disk (VD or vdisk for short) is a virtual device that provides an area of usable storage capacity on one or more physical disk drive(s) in a computer system. The disk is described as logical or virtual because it does not actually exist as a single physical entity in its own right. The goal of the logical disk is to provide computer software with what seems a contiguous storage area, sparing them the burden of dealing with the intricacies of storing files on multiple physical units. Most modern operating systems provide some form of logical volume management.

== Levels ==
Logical disks can be defined at various levels in the storage infrastructure.

=== Operating system ===
An operating system may define volumes or logical disks and assign each to one physical disk, more than one physical disk or part of the storage area of a physical disk. For example, Windows NT can create several partitions on a hard disk drive, each of which a separate volume with its own file system. Each floppy disk drive, optical disc drive or USB flash drive in Windows NT becomes one volume. Windows NT can also create partitions that span multiple hard disks drives. Each volume is identified with a drive letter.

=== Storage area network ===
Storage area networks (SANs) consolidate inhomogeneous storage devices. As such logical disks or vdisks allow computer programs to access files stored on a SAN.

=== Storage subsystem ===
A hardware-level redundant array of independent disks (RAID) exposes itself to the operating system as one logical disk while the array itself consists of several disks. The operating system either does not know that the hardware with which it is interfacing is a RAID, or knows but still does not concern itself with intricate details of storage. In case of the latter, specialized management, maintenance and diagnostics software dedicated to that specific RAID may run on the operating system.

== Motivation ==
When IBM first released the magnetic disk drive in the 1956 IBM 305, a single disk drive would be directly attached to each system, managed as a single entity. As the development of drives continued, it became apparent that reliability was a problem and systems using RAID technology evolved, so that more than one physical disk is used to produce a single logical disk.

Many modern business information technology environments use a SAN. Here, many storage devices are connected to many host server devices in a network. A single RAID array may provide some capacity to one server, and some capacity to another. Therefore, logical disks are used to partition the available capacity and provide the amount of storage needed by each host from a common pool of logical disks. The IBM SAN Volume Controller uses the term "vdisk" to refer to these logical disks.

Today, the rationale for the logical disk approach starts to be questioned and solutions that offer more flexibility and better abstraction are increasingly needed.

== See also ==
- Storage virtualization
