= Texas Memory Systems =

Corporation that produced SSDs and DSPs

Texas Memory Systems, Inc.
- Type: Subsidiary
- Industry: Solid State Storage; Digital signal processing
- Founded: 1978; 48 years ago
- Headquarters: Houston, Texas, United States
- Area served: 35 countries
- Key people: Holly Frost, (Founder); Dan Scheel (President)
- Products: solid-state disks Digital signal processors
- Number of employees: < 100 (2011)
- Parent: IBM
- Website: ramsan.com

Texas Memory Systems, Inc. (TMS) was an American corporation that designed and manufactured solid-state disks (SSDs) and digital signal processors (DSPs). TMS was founded in 1978 and that same year introduced their first solid-state drive, followed by their first digital signal processor. In 2000 they introduced the RamSan line of SSDs. Based in Houston, Texas, they supply these two product categories (directly as well as OEM and reseller partners) to large enterprise and government organizations.

TMS has been supplying SSD products to the market longer than any other company.

On August 16, 2012, IBM Corporation announced a definitive agreement to acquire Texas Memory Systems, Inc. This acquisition was completed as planned on October 1, 2012.

== History ==
TMS was founded in 1978 in Houston, Texas by Holly Frost to address a need in seismic processing for the oil and gas industry. The company's first product, the CMPS was a 16 Kilobyte (KB) custom SSD designed for Gulf Oil.

=== SAM product line ===
Around 1988, TMS designed and sold hundreds of SAM-600/800 (Shared Attached Memory) storage enclosures mainly to the United States Department of Defense. These enclosures used 128 Megabytes (MB) of Dynamic random-access memory (DRAM) for data storage and several high-speed Emitter-coupled logic (ECL) inputs and outputs for data transfer. These systems were mainly used to acquire and analyze signals in real time.

When the 1980s oil glut caused disruption in the oil and gas industry, TMS shifted focus away from SSDs and onto Digital signal processing products. The previously-designed SAM storage systems were enhanced by adding in a custom designed DSP board. Prior to this added DSP capability, to analyze a signal, a user would have to send the signal to the SAM storage for staging, engage a separate system to perform digital signal processing, then store the result back to the SAM system for analyzing. Adding the DSP processor into the storage system itself meant that the data could be stored, processed, and analyzed all within the SAM system itself, relieving the host systems from processing duties. With this change in product focus, the SAM product line became known for DSP more than for SSD. The company would release more DSP systems under the SAM brand name in the 1990s: The SAM-2000 (1990), the SAM-300/350, and the SAM-450 (1997). The SAM-300, a 512 MB Solid State Disk, is notable as being a reference high-speed data store to optimize and benchmark other bottlenecks in computing systems, such as Network File System (NFS) and Local area networks (LANs), as other storage media at the time were not fast enough to expose these bottlenecks.

In 2004, TMS partnered with StarGen (later acquired by Dolphin Interconnect Solutions) to integrate the SAM-650 DSP system with the StarFabric switched interconnect. The solution would support military-grade embedded applications by providing 192 Gigaflops of processing performance and 16 gigabits of bandwidth.

=== XP product line ===
While the company was developing SAM systems that attached to multiple hosts, it also started developing DSP solutions on PCI cards to address the single-host market. The XP-15, XP-30, XP-35, and XP-100 products were released to the market and were architecturally modeled after the SAM systems. The XP-30 and XP-35 utilize the TM-44 DSP, and the XP-100 utilize the TM-100 DSP. Both of these DSP chips were custom designed ASICs from TMS.

=== RamSan product line ===
==== RAM based products ====
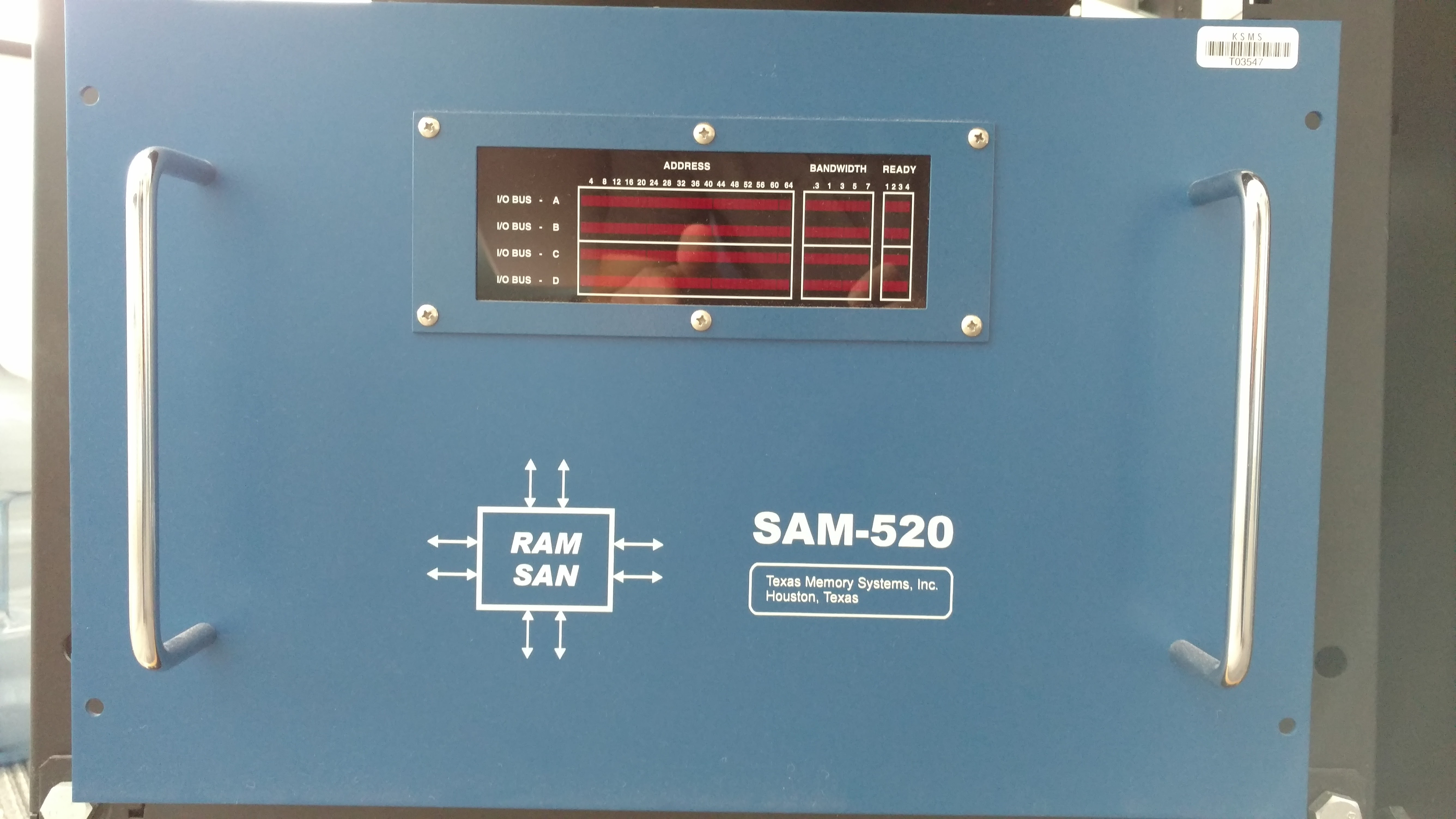
RamSan-520 first RamSan branded solid state disk from Texas Memory Systems

In 2000, TMS started working on a new line of SSD products, the SAM-500/520, that would feature standard interfaces and protocols such as Fibre Channel. The SAM-520 was the first SSD product from TMS to use the RamSan brand. It featured 64 Gigabytes (GB) of DRAM for user data storage and up to 15 1 Gb/s Fibre Channel interfaces.

TMS officially entered the commercial storage market on April 10, 2001 with the announcement of the RamSan-210 which featured up to 32 GB of DRAM for user data storage, 4 Fibre Channel ports and promised 200,000 IOPs in a 2U rack-mountable enclosure. In order to assure that the user data written to DRAM would be persistent, in addition to writing user data to DRAM, the 210 also wrote user data to two mirrored hot swappable hard disk drives, a feature dubbed Triple-Mirror mode. It also included redundant uninterruptible power supplies which would power the unit for a short time during a brownout, and allow the system to safely shut down in case of a total power loss.

A product refresh followed on November 11, 2002 with the announcement of the RamSan-220 at Oracle OpenWorld in San Francisco, USA. The product doubled the Fibre Channel interface speed to 2 Gbps and added a new mode of operation called DataSynch. DataSynch mode kept the hard disk drives offline and sent the read and write operations to memory only. In a power outage, the data from memory would be flushed to disk. TMS would later release a 1 Terabyte (TB) solid state disk solution called Tera-RamSan on February 26, 2003 which was composed of 32 RamSan-220 units spread across two racks. The solution would consume 5 KW of power, support up to 2,000 Logical unit numbers (LUNs), and service over 2 million IOPs. A monitoring software dubbed Tera-RamSan at a Glance would allow the user to see system level status at a glance.

On July 1, 2003 TMS announced the follow on RamSan-320. This product increased the height of the enclosure to 3U and added a third hard disk drive now in RAID-3 to backup user data. It provided up to 64 GB of DRAM for user data storage, up to eight 2 Gbps Fibre Channel ports, and increased the performance up to 250,000 IOPs. It also included a new optional patent-pending feature called Active Backup. With Active Backup enabled, reads and writes would go only to memory just like DataSynch mode, but a background task would continually backup the data stored in memory to the hard disk drives offering the benefit of always having the user data backed up similar to Triple-Mirror mode. Three weeks later, on July 29, 2003 TMS announced the RamSan-330 which included the same exact specifications as the 320, but optimized for a new use case. The 330 could be connected to servers, switches, and storage and would be transparent to the host operating system. It would automatically cache frequently accessed blocks, improving read and write performance of any attached storage. It offered user-configurable write-through, write-back, and read-ahead cache modes. The 330 was demonstrated accelerating a Digi-Data STORM at CeBIT on March 22, 2004. The 320 was refreshed and released as the RamSan-325 on November 9, 2004, and doubled the available capacity up to 128 GB.

The product line was expanded with the addition of a new 1U entry level RamSan-120 on December 7, 2004. The 120 implemented the DRAM in a RAID configuration to increase reliability, and was only offered in an 8 GB configuration. It delivered 70,000 IOPs and up to 400 MB/s bandwidth

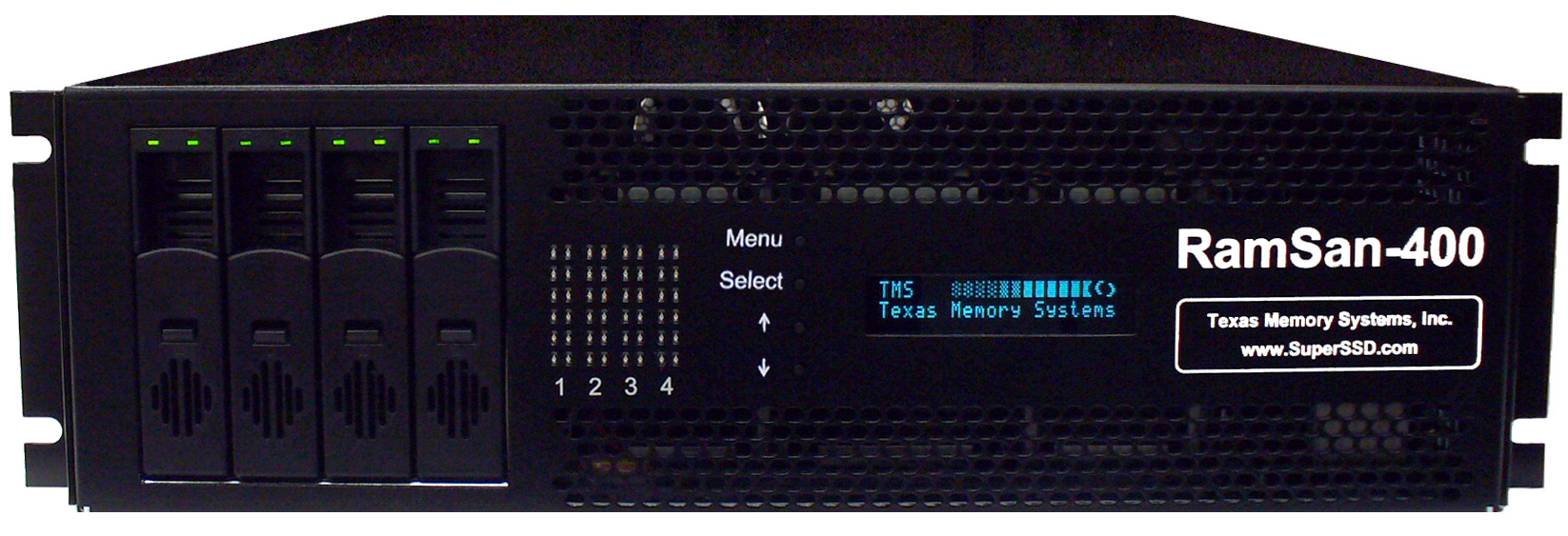
DDR SDRAM based rackmount SSD

A replacement for the 325, the RamSan-400 was announced on July 11, 2005. The interfaces were updated to support 4 Gb Fibre Channel, and the performance was improved to 3 GB/s bandwidth and 500,000 IOPs. The system added support for IBM Chipkill based ECC protection and increased the number of backup hard disk drives to 4. The 4 Gb Fibre Channel interfaces were made available to customers of older RamSan products as a miscellaneous equipment specification (MES) upgrade option

A new 10 Gbps InfiniBand interface was announced on November 15, 2005 and was made generally available the following year.

A cost-reduced 3U enclosure, the RamSan-300 was announced on October 16, 2006. It could achieve a maximum performance of 200,000 IOPs and 1.5 GB/s bandwidth, and the memory configurations were limited to 16 or 32 GB. This product, along with the RamSan-400, was the foundation for the Oracle Accelerator Kit which bundled a RamSan with QLogic InifiBand switches and Host Channel Adapters (HCA)s.

==== Flash based products ====
TMS pivoted with the storage market and on September 17, 2007 announced a new 4U rack-mount enterprise solid state disk product, the RamSan-500, using NAND Flash memory as the primary user data storage medium instead of DRAM. The 500 used a 64 GB DDR memory cache in front of up to 2 TB of SLC flash storage. The flash storage was arrayed in nine RAID-3 protected hot swappable modules. This product marked the beginning of development of the RamSan-OS, which was a custom designed flash management and storage infrastructure management suite implemented in both software and hardware.

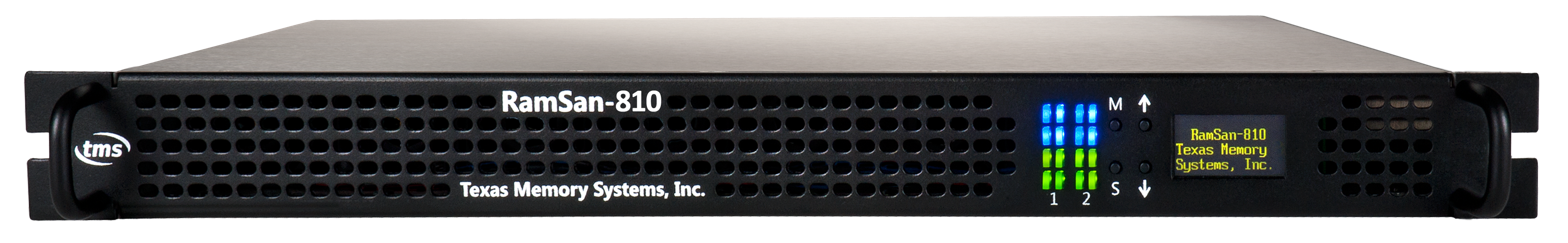
Flash based rackmount SSD

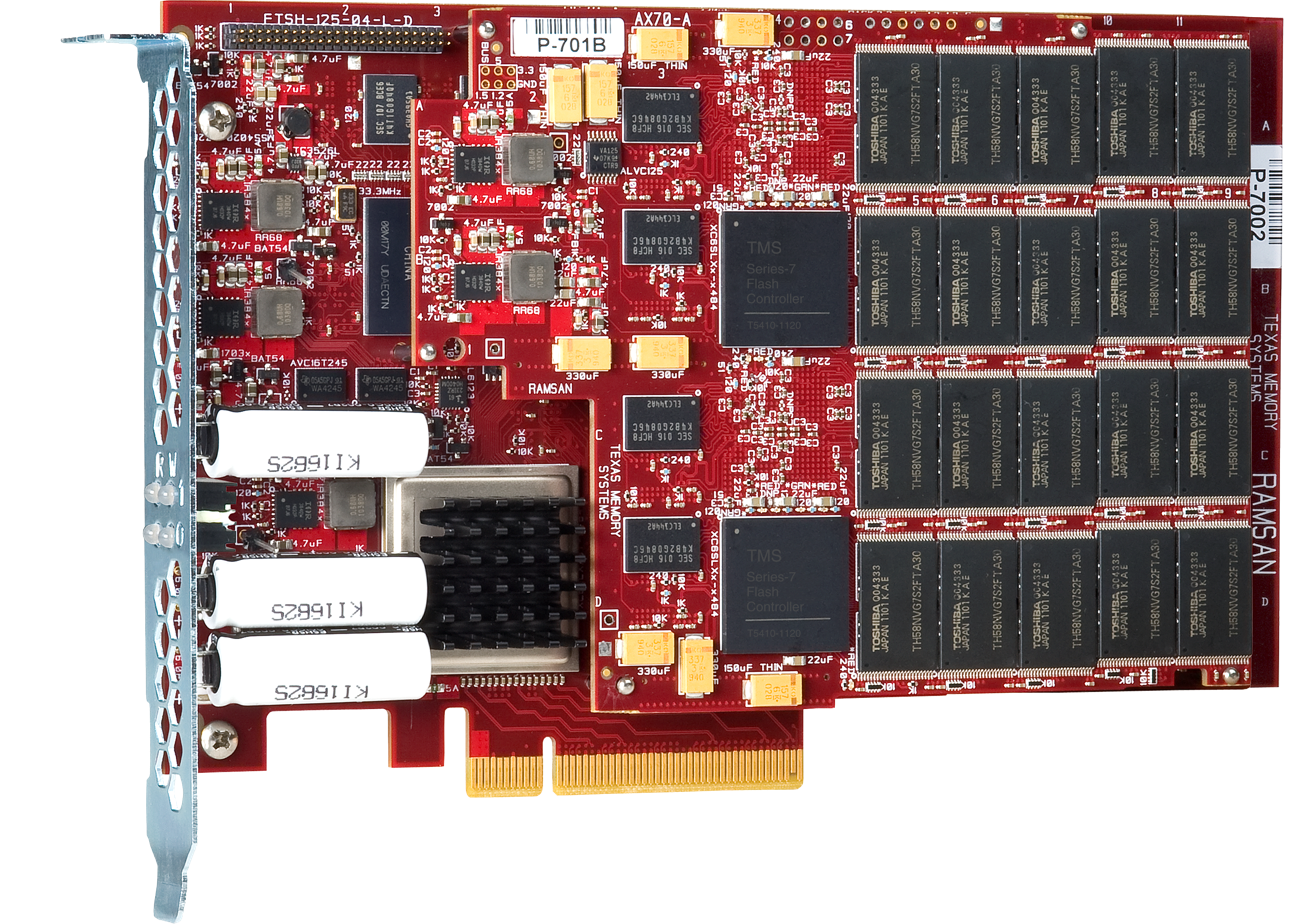
Flash based PCIe SSD

=== TMS Acquires Incipient IP ===
On September 8, 2009 TMS announced it had acquired all of the intellectual property and source code from Incipient, Inc., a privately held software company and leading provider of enterprise-class storage virtualization and automated data migration software founded in 2001 in Waltham, Massachusetts. Incipient's flagship product was the Incipient Network Storage Platform (iNSP) software suite, a switch-resident storage virtualization software for Storage Area Network (SAN) environments first released in 2006. Incipient held at least five storage virtualization patents with the most significant patent, titled "Fast-path for performing data operations," covering split-path architecture for block level storage virtualization in scalable and highly-available switching fabrics. In 2006, Incipient raised $24 million in Series D financing bringing the total capital raised to $79 million, and in 2008 raised an additional $15.6 million in Series E funding. The acquired software and IP would allow TMS to incorporate a storage virtualization solution into their portfolio by either clustering existing RamSan SSDs, enabling intelligent storage tiering with disk-based systems, or easing migration from disk-based systems. In the announcement, TMS indicated that it had not acquired any interest in Incipient, Inc. and that the two companies would remain separate.

=== IBM Acquisition ===
On December 21, 2011, shortly after announcing their first high availability (HA) SSD product, the RamSan-720, TMS announced that they were putting themselves up for sale. The company was looking to be acquired by a large IT company such as EMC Corporation, Hewlett-Packard, IBM, Oracle Corporation or NetApp. This coincides with a general consolidation in the industry such as SanDisk's acquisition of Pliant earlier in the year, a series of run-ups to IPO announcements such as Violin Memory, as well as new startups such as Pure Storage entering the market.

Less than one year later, on August 16, 2012, IBM announced they had entered into a definitive agreement to acquire TMS. The details of the deal were not disclosed. IBM planned to invest in and support the existing TMS product portfolio and integrate TMS technologies into a variety of solutions including storage, servers, software, and PureSystems offerings. At the time of the announcement, TMS employed approximately 100 people. The acquisition was completed on October 1, 2012, and the TMS products, services, and employees were integrated into the IBM Systems and Technology Group (STG).

As part of the acquisition, TMS was subjected to the IBM Blue Wash process, and the existing RamSan product line was re-released with IBM branding FlashSystem and an announcement of a $1B USD investment in research and development to design, create, and integrate new Flash solutions into its existing product portfolio.

== Products ==
Some TMS SSDs were specifically designed to accelerate Oracle applications. They are all part of the RamSan product line.

TMS produces the following categories of SSDs:

- PCIe Flash memory-based drives
- Flash memory-based systems
- Flash memory and RAM-based (cached Flash) systems
- RAM-based systems

Most of the TMS DSP products are part of the XP product line.
