= IBM FlashSystem =

IBM Storage enterprise system that store data on flash memory

IBM FlashSystem 9500
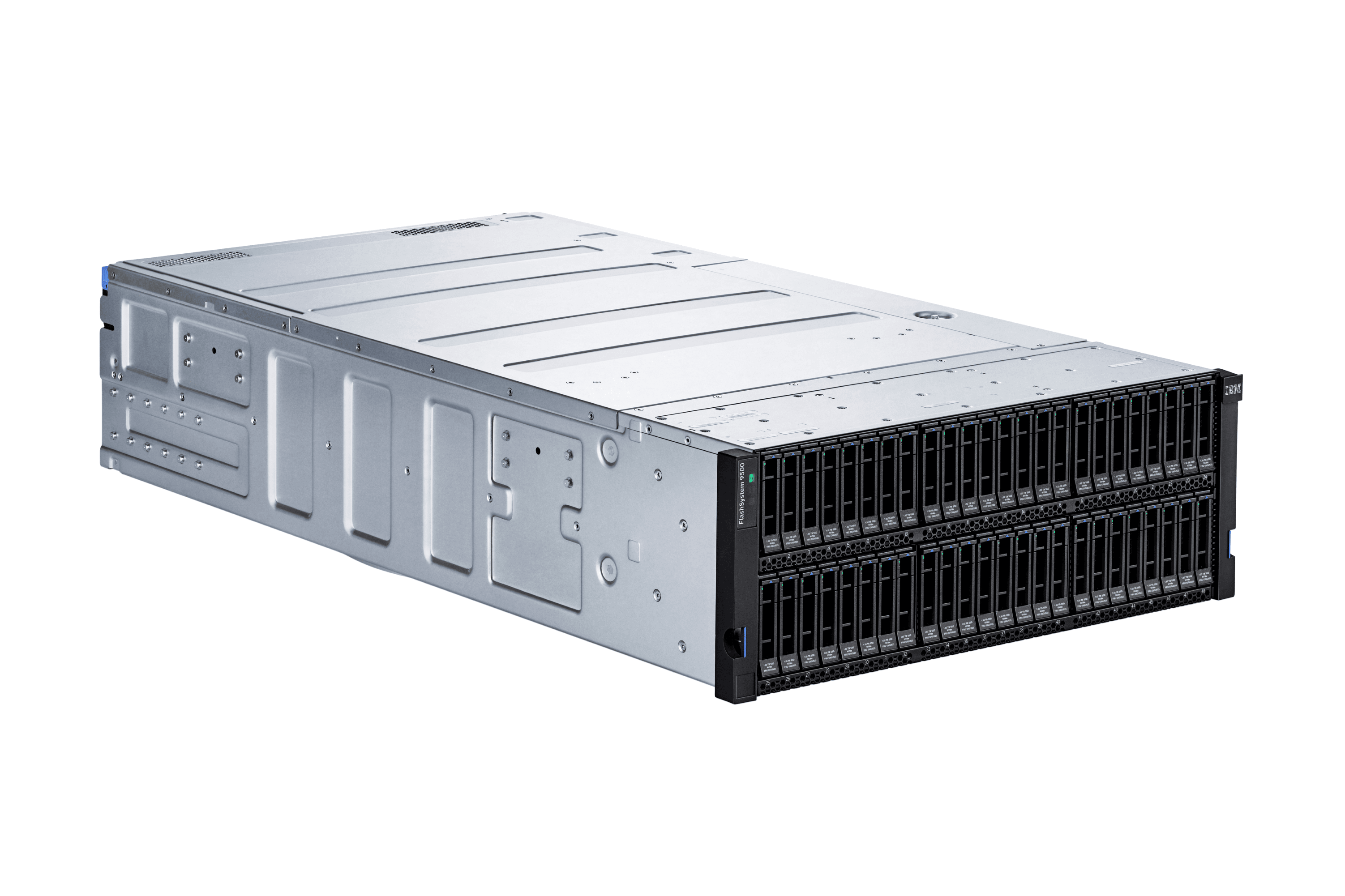
- Common manufacturers: IBM
- Type: Storage controller
- Processor: Intel Ice Lake, Gen 4 PCIe, Two 24-core CPUs for a total of 96-cores per system
- Memory: Effective maximum capacity within single enclosure: 6.60 PBe (4U enclosure)
- Slots: Dual-ported 2.5” NVMe Flash bays x 48 (Up to 38.4TB per drive)
- Read-only memory: 3TB Cache
- Ports: 12 PCIe G4 Interface Card Slots per enclosure. 32/64Gb Fibre Channel supports NVMe-oF and 25/100Gb RoCE Ethernet supports NVMe RDMA. Maximum front-end host ports: 48
- Speed: Maximum bandwidth (reads): 100 GB per second Response times (reads): < 50 microseconds Max IOPS (4k read miss): 2.5 Million
- Weight: Fully configured (48 drives): 70.5Kg
- Dimensions: Height: 17.43 cm (6.8 in.) Width: 44.6 cm (17.6 in.) Depth: 82.6 cm (32.6 in.)

IBM FlashSystem is a family of high-performance, flash-based storage systems that form part of the IBM Storage enterprise portfolio. The platform integrates proprietary hardware and software, AI-powered management tools, and subscription-based service models. Recent developments have emphasized enhanced performance, scalable architecture, AI-driven analytics, multi-layer ransomware protection, data resilience, and non-disruptive data migration.

According to Gartner, IBM was the number one all-flash storage array vendor in 2014 selling over 2,100 FlashSystems totaling 62 petabytes (PB) of capacity. The IBM FlashSystem commanded 33% of the total all-flash capacity sold by all vendors for the year.

IBM FlashSystem products incorporate custom hardware based on technology from the 2012 IBM acquisition of Texas Memory Systems. As of February 12, 2020, the FlashSystem brand has replaced both the Storwize and XIV brands in IBM.

In February 2026, IBM announced a new generation of its FlashSystem storage portfolio that includes agentic artificial intelligence capabilities. According to IBM, the systems use AI agents to assist with storage management tasks such as performance optimization, threat detection, and recovery recommendations.

== Product line (2026) ==
IBM FlashSystem product family includes a range of models designed to address diverse performance, capacity, and workload requirements, while all sharing the same common software stack known as IBM Storage Virtualize and also the same AI analytics cloud base platform known as IBM Storage Insights.

=== FlashSystem 9600 ===
The IBM FlashSystem 9600 is designed for organizations running resource-heavy applications and data environments. Equipped with fifth-generation FlashCore Modules, FlashSystem.ai, and IBM Storage Virtualize, it combines high density, consistent low-latency performance, and built-in cyber resilience. The FlashSystem 9600 helps organizations consolidate infrastructure, simplify operations, and scale mission-critical workloads.

=== FlashSystem 7600 ===
The IBM FlashSystem 7600 is an enterprise storage system that includes FlashCore Modules, FlashSystem.ai, and data services for business applications.

=== FlashSystem 5600 ===
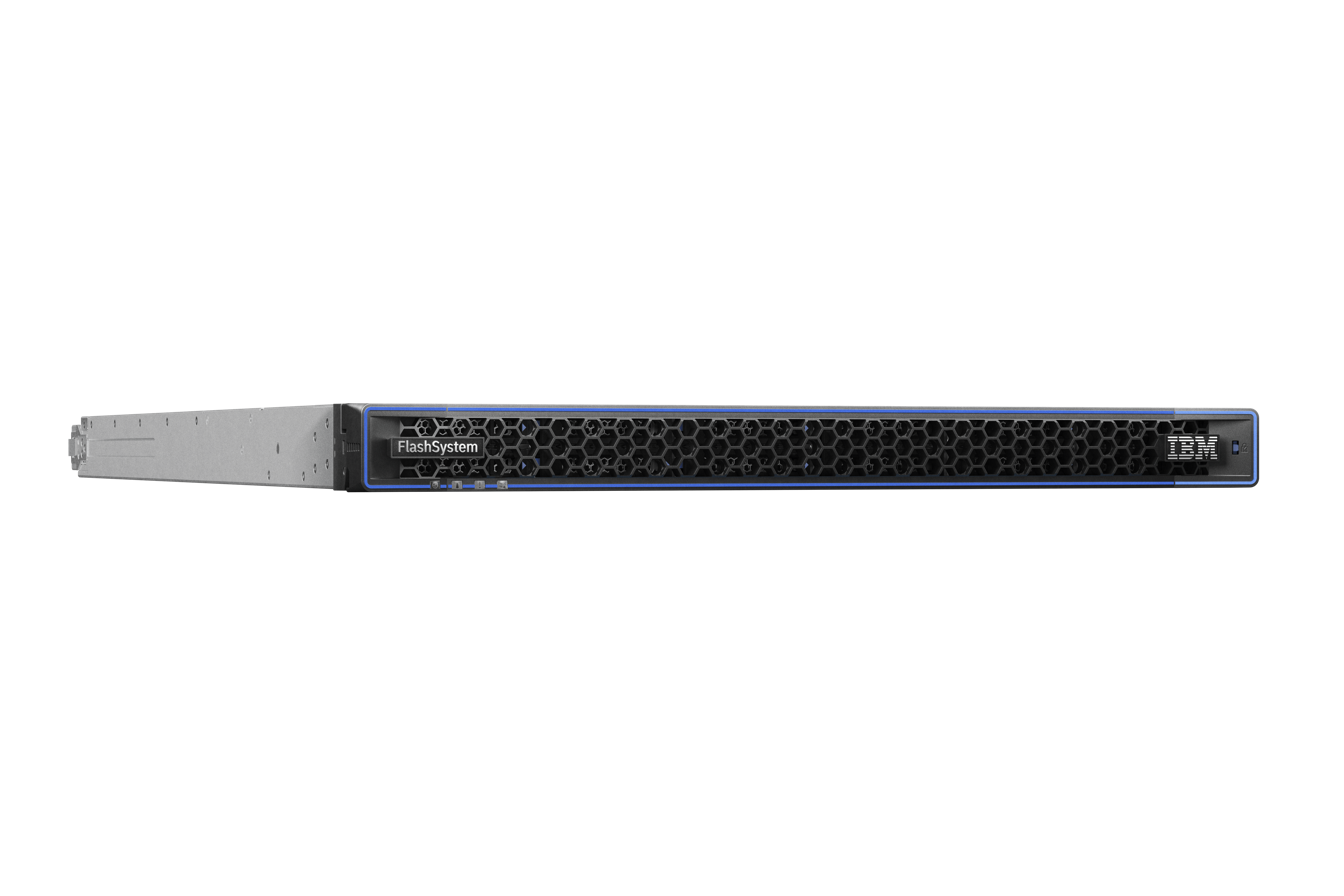
IBM FlashSystem 5300

The IBM FlashSystem 5600 brings FlashCore Module technology to organizations seeking enterprise-class capabilities.

=== FlashSystem C300 ===
The IBM FlashSystem C300 is purpose-built for organizations facing rapid data growth in backup, archive, data lake, and other capacity-oriented environments. By combining the density and efficiency advantages of flash with the intelligence of the FlashSystem platform, it enables clients to store more data, reduce infrastructure footprint, and simplify long-term capacity management.

=== FlashSystem 5015 and 5045 ===
The IBM FlashSystem 5015 and 5045 provide storage for small and midsize environments, remote offices, and departmental workloads.

== IBM Storage Virtualize ==
IBM Storage Virtualize is the software-defined storage layer embedded in IBM FlashSystem and SAN Volume Controller (SVC). As of version 8.7.0 (released in 2025), Storage Virtualize extends beyond basic virtualization, offering a suite of advanced data services that are included by default across the FlashSystem portfolio.

New and integrated capabilities introduced in version 8.7.0 include:

- IBM FlashSystem grid: Enables up to 32 FlashSystem or SVC systems to operate as a unified grid, providing scalable data mobility and centralized management.
- AI-driven Policy Automation: Integrates with IBM Storage Insights to apply policies for replication, placement, and performance optimization.
- Enhanced Safeguarded Copy Integration: Provides immutable policy-driven snapshots air gaped in the controller, for ransomware recovery and regulatory compliance, now more deeply integrated with other resilience tools (IBM Storage Defender). This gives FlashSystem the capability to restore thousands of data bases, virtual machines or containers is minutes improving RTO times.
- Automated Data Rebalancing: Redistributes data across nodes or systems to maintain consistent performance and resource utilization, this optimization will remove silos and combined with the IBM FlashSystem grid capabilities, you can migrate non disruptively without programed down time.

These enhancements position Storage Virtualize not only as a management layer, but as a foundational platform for hybrid cloud integration, cyber resilience, and automated operations within enterprise storage environments.

=== Ransomware detection ===
In 2024, IBM introduced real-time, multi-layered ransomware detection capabilities across its FlashSystem portfolio. The feature integrates artificial intelligence (AI) and machine learning (ML) to analyze input/output (I/O) patterns at the drive level, making IBM FlashSystem one of the first enterprise storage platforms to provide ransomware detection directly within the data path by analyzing the data entropy.

The detection framework operates through a multi-layered design. At the hardware level, IBM FlashCore Modules (FCMs) inspect and analyze every I/O operation in real time. These telemetry insights are then compiled by the system controller and transmitted securely to IBM Cloud through IBM Storage Insights. There, the data is evaluated using up-to-date ransomware detection models managed by IBM. If an anomaly consistent with ransomware behavior is identified, Storage Insights generates an alert—typically within 60 seconds of the initial threat activity—enabling rapid response to minimize impact.

This capability is integrated with IBM's broader cyber resilience offerings, including IBM Safeguarded Copy and IBM Storage Defender, to provide end-to-end detection, protection, and recovery.

=== IBM FlashSystem grid ===
Introduced in 2024, IBM FlashSystem Grid is a federated storage architecture designed to unify management and operations across multiple FlashSystem and IBM SAN Volume Controller (SVC) systems. The technology supports up to eight systems functioning as a coordinated storage grid, offering many of the advantages of traditional clustering while extending beyond its limitations.

Key features of FlashSystem Grid include:

- Predictive resource optimization: The system uses AI-driven analytics to anticipate future storage demands, allowing for proactive capacity and performance tuning.
- Non-disruptive data mobility: Storage volumes can be dynamically moved across systems within the grid without impacting host or application availability. This supports tiering, rebalancing, and workload optimization.
- Fleet-wide management: Administrators can manage all systems in the grid from a centralized interface, simplifying operations at scale.
- Storage virtualization: FlashSystem Grid supports the virtualization of not only IBM FlashSystem and SVC hardware but also third-party (non-IBM) storage arrays, enabling heterogeneous storage environments under a unified control plane.

FlashSystem Grid also facilitates one-click, non-disruptive data migrations. Through integration with IBM Storage Insights, users can initiate a migration by selecting a storage partition and a destination. The system’s embedded AI validates the target environment and performs the migration automatically, preserving all data mappings and replication policies without requiring host reconfiguration or causing downtime.

Underlying this capability is IBM’s use of modular data constructs—comparable to "containers"—that encapsulate data along with associated metadata. This approach enables enhanced provisioning, mobility, and intelligent placement recommendations, distinguishing IBM’s implementation from traditional storage clustering technologies.

=== IBM Storage Insights ===
IBM Storage Insights is a cloud-based storage monitoring and analytics platform developed by IBM. It provides centralized visibility, predictive analytics, and AI-driven recommendations for IBM and non-IBM storage systems. Offered in both a free and a paid (Pro) version, Storage Insights is designed to help organizations manage capacity, performance, health, and data protection across their hybrid storage environments.

Originally introduced as part of IBM’s broader storage management portfolio, Storage Insights collects telemetry data from on-premises storage systems and sends it securely to the IBM Cloud. There, the platform applies AI analytics and machine learning models to identify trends, detect anomalies, and provide proactive recommendations.

Key features include:

- Real-time performance monitoring across multiple storage systems and vendors.
- AI-driven alerts and recommendations, including early warnings for performance bottlenecks, capacity issues, and ransomware-like behavior.
- Capacity forecasting using historical usage data and trend analysis.
- Firmware compliance and patch recommendations, helping ensure systems remain secure and up to date.
- Integration with IBM Storage Defender and Safeguarded Copy, enabling enhanced cyber resilience and immutable snapshot management.
- REST APIs and third-party integrations, allowing connection with tools such as ServiceNow, Grafana, Prometheus, and Slack.

IBM Storage Insights is embedded into the management experience of IBM FlashSystem, SAN Volume Controller (SVC), and other IBM Storage products. It also supports heterogeneous environments by enabling limited monitoring of select non-IBM systems.

=== Quantum-Safe FlashCore Module (FCM v4) ===
In 2024, IBM introduced the 4th generation of its proprietary FlashCore Module (FCM), incorporating quantum-safe cryptographic techniques. The FCM v4 uses a hybrid cryptography approach that combines traditional and post-quantum algorithms to protect both data in motion and firmware integrity.

Key security features include:

- Hybrid key exchange: Utilizes a combination of traditional asymmetric encryption and the post-quantum CRYSTALS-Kyber algorithm for secure transmission of unlock PINs from the storage controller to the FCM.
- Firmware signature verification: Employs CRYSTALS-Dilithium digital signatures, alongside classical methods, to verify the authenticity of firmware updates.
- Bulk data encryption: All customer data written to flash memory is encrypted using XTS-AES-256, a symmetric encryption method considered secure against both classical and currently known quantum attacks.

While AES-256 remains resistant to known quantum decryption techniques such as Grover’s algorithm, the integration of post-quantum cryptography into FlashSystem components represents a forward-looking approach to long-term data protection in the emerging quantum computing era.

== History ==
=== Origin ===
The IBM FlashSystem architecture was originally developed by Texas Memory Systems (TMS) as their RamSan product line. TMS was a small private company founded in 1978 and based in Houston, Texas, that supplied solid-state drive products to the market longer than any other company. The TMS RamSan line of enterprise solid state storage products was first launched in the early 2000s with the RamSan-520, and over seven RamSan technology generations were released through 2012, when TMS was acquired by IBM. As RamSan technology evolved, TMS adapted the systems to different storage media (DRAM, single-level cell flash memory, and multi-level cell flash memory) and external storage area network interfaces (Fibre Channel and InfiniBand), but the core system design principles remained relatively constant: custom hardware with a shared internal network to maximize speed, particularly latency. The last RamSan products available were the RamSan-710, RamSan-810, RamSan-720, and RamSan-820 systems, which were replaced directly with corresponding IBM FlashSystem products in 2013.

=== Integration into IBM ===
IBM FlashSystem products were first made generally available on April 11, 2013, in conjunction with the announcement of a US$1 billion investment in flash optimization research and development. At the Flash Ahead event, IBM emphasized the economic "tipping point" that flash had reached versus traditional storage devices for high-performance applications.

On January 16, 2014, IBM announced the FlashSystem 840 product, which was the first FlashSystem designed entirely by IBM post-acquisition of TMS. The key enhancements of the new generation were RAS enhancements, higher capacities, higher performance, new 16 Gbit Fibre Channel and 10 Gbit Fibre Channel over Ethernet interfaces, and a new management GUI. IBM also announced the FlashSystem Enterprise Performance Solution, which added software features and functions to the 840, including real-time compression, replication, and snapshots.

IBM refreshed the product line on February 19, 2015 by announcing the FlashSystem 900 model AE2, a direct replacement for the FlashSystem 840, and the FlashSystem V9000 which combined a FlashSystem 900 model AE2 enclosure with a pair of San Volume Controllers. The V9000 brought software-defined storage into the FlashSystem brand for the first time, all managed under one management domain, also called a single-pane-of-glass. Both of these products relied on Micron Technology's MLC flash chip technology

The product line was expanded on April 27, 2016 when IBM announced two new products, the FlashSystem A9000 and A9000R model 415. Both of these products included features specifically designed for cloud environments. They incorporated pattern removal, data de-duplication, and real-time compression combined with the IBM FlashCore technology to deliver consistent low latency performance. The A9000 was a fully configured solution, while the A9000R enabled a grid architecture and the ability to scale to petabytes of storage. These products relied on Spectrum Accelerate (formerly XIV) running on dedicated grid controllers to perform the software defined storage functions coupled with FlashSystem 900 storage enclosures. The A9000 included the ability to migrate from XIV Gen3 systems.

==== FlashSystem brand replaces XIV brand ====
IBM announced an update to the FlashSystem 900 on October 23, 2017, with new models AE3 and UF3. This marks the first time that the FlashSystem brand offered a consumption model UF3 for the product line whereby a customer would only pay for what they used. The update tripled the capacity of the array and added at-line-speed hardware user data compression. The MicroLatency flash modules were updated to 32-layer 3D TLC NAND flash from Micron. Rather than the compression feature slowing down data access as usually happens with software based compression, the 900 continued to advertise 1.2 million I/O operations per second (IOPs) due to the hardware compression implementation and hardware only data path. The compression engines were implemented in each flash module and, with the capability to have up to 12 modules per enclosure, a fully loaded enclosure therefore would have a total of 12 hardware compression engines.

The very next day on October 24, 2017 IBM announced an update to the FlashSystem A9000 with the new model 425. This new model would incorporate the previously-announced FlashSystem 900 model AE3, but retain the same grid controllers as the 415 model. With two generations of FlashSystem A9000 now in the market, the 415 model and the 425 model, IBM on February 27, 2018 announced the end of marketing for the XIV storage systems models 214 and 314, commonly known as "XIV Gen3". They listed the replacement product as the A9000 model 425. This announcement marked the end of the XIV Storage System brand with the FlashSystem brand taking its place.

==== FlashSystem brand replaces Storwize brand ====
With the announcement of the FlashSystem 9100 on July 10, 2018, the product line added a new enclosure that was designed with NVM Express (NVMe) from end-to-end. The 9100 was the first FlashSystem product which combined the Spectrum Virtualize software stack with the IBM Flash Core Module technology in a single enclosure. To achieve this, IBM redesigned the proprietary custom form-factor MicroLatency Flash Modules with FlashCore technology into a standard 2 1/2 inch form-factor NVMe SSD. The included Flash Core Modules were available in 4.8TB, 9.6TB, and 19.2TB capacities with up to 5:1 compression.

On February 12, 2020, IBM announced an expansion of the FlashSystem line to include the FlashSystem 7200, FlashSystem 9200, and FlashSystem 9200R. Additionally, IBM announced the FlashSystem 5010, 5030, and 5100 which are re-branded Storwize storage enclosures. With this announcement, IBM retired the Storwize brand and simplified the distributed storage portfolio underneath the FlashSystems brand. The Storwize V5000 and V5100 are replaced by the FlashSystem 5000 and 5100 respectively. The FlashSystem 900 and Storwize V7000 are replaced by the FlashSystem 7200. The FlashSystem V9000 and 9100 are replaced by the FlashSystem 9200. The FlashSystem A9000R is replaced by the FlashSystem 9200R. With this announcement, the FlashSystem product line will no longer include enclosures with end-to-end hardware only data path technology from the Texas Memory Systems (RamSan) acquisition nor will it include enclosures running Spectrum Accelerate software from the (XIV) acquisition, however, the product still retains the IBM FlashCore based flash modules developed at TMS

== Technology ==
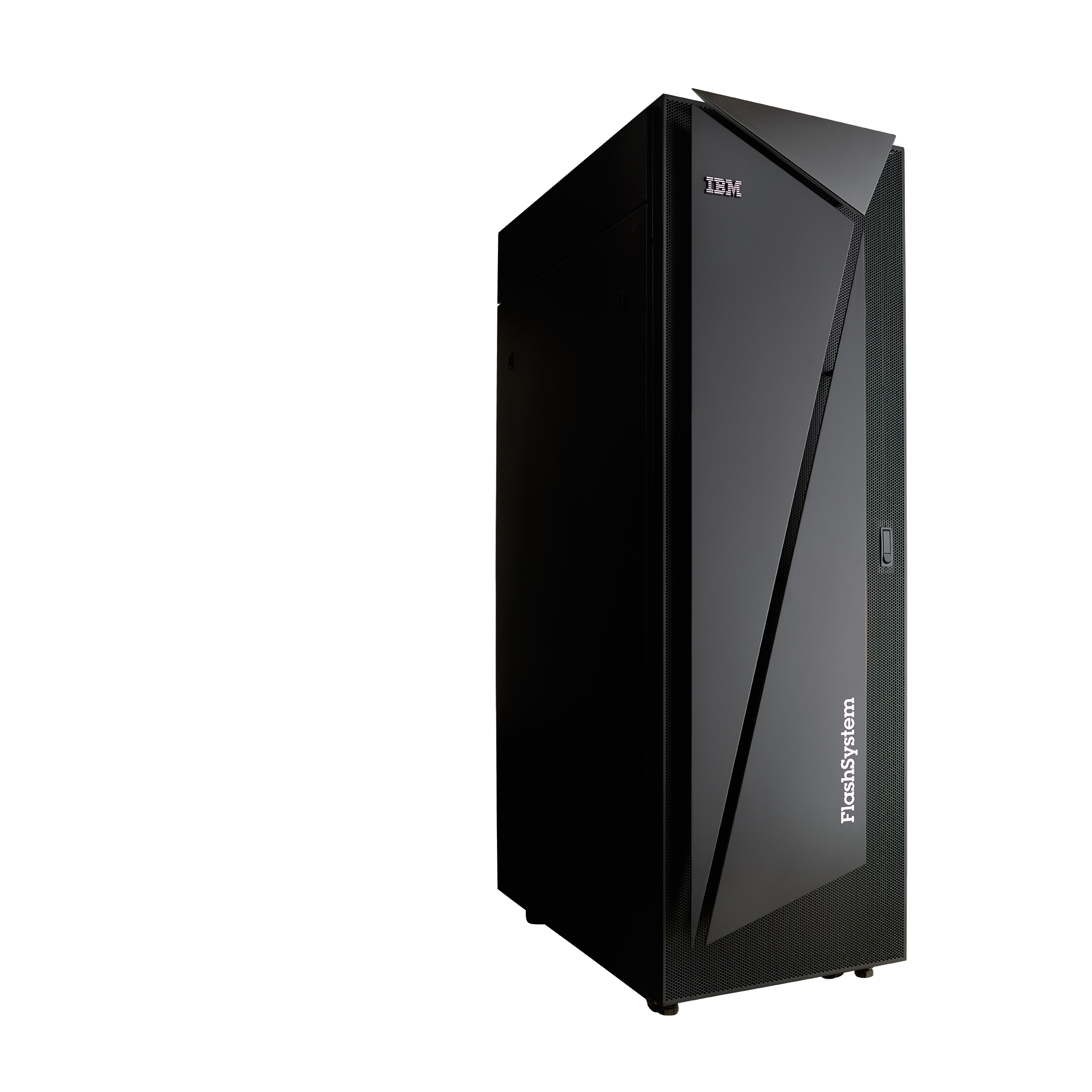
FlashSystem A9000R

IBM FlashSystem products are based on a custom hardware architecture that incorporates field-programmable gate arrays (FPGAs). The FlashSystem design omits traditional server-based array controllers. The primary components of each FlashSystem unit include custom flash modules, external storage area network interfaces, and FPGA logic that spreads data through the system. Each flash module within a FlashSystem incorporates enterprise multi-level cell or single-level cell flash chips and FPGAs that provide IBM Variable Stripe RAID data protection as well as standard flash memory controller functions. IBM claims that these architectural attributes provide strong performance, reliability, and efficiency. In August 2013, IBM submitted a single FlashSystem 820 SPC-1 benchmark result to the Storage Performance Council that showed fast response time (SPC-1 LRT) and high SPC-1 IOPS per external storage port - common measures of high storage performance - as well as low power consumption.

IBM claims that enterprise multi-level cell flash plus Variable Stripe RAID and other IBM reliability technology forms a good balance between reliability and economics for most enterprise environments. IBM Variable Stripe RAID is a patented highly granular RAID 5 type data protection arrangement implemented across each set of 10 flash chips in the system. IBM FlashSystem 900, 840, 820, and 720 products also include a second layer of RAID 5 implemented within the data distribution logic at the system level, providing "two-dimensional" data protection within the system. IBM claims that this two-dimensional protection is strongly differentiated within the industry.

== Models ==
FlashSystem model list
Position	Form Factor		before	2013	2014	2015	2016	2017	2018	2019	2020	2021
Entry	Rack- mount	2U	IBM Storwize								50#0	50#5
Entry	Rack- mount	1U	IBM Storwize								5100	5200
Mid-range	Rack- mount	2U	IBM Storwize								7200	
Mid-range	Rack- mount	1U	TMS RamSan	710								
Mid-range	Rack- mount	1U	TMS RamSan	810								
Hi-end	Rack- mount	1U	TMS RamSan	720								
Hi-end	Rack- mount	1U	TMS RamSan	820								
Hi-end	Rack- mount	2U			840		900 AE2 900 UF2	900 AE3 900 UF3				
Hi-end	Rack- mount	6U			v840		V9000		91#0		9200 9200R	
Hi-end	Rack- mount	8U						A9000				
Hi-end	Rack cabinet		IBM XIV					A9000R				

=== FlashSystem A9000 and A9000R ===
IBM FlashSystem A9000 is a 8U rackmount unit with up to 300 TB of usable storage capacity provided by FlashSystem 900 modules, managed by IBM Spectrum Accelerate software. It's scalable sibling, the FlashSystem A9000R, consists of a minimum of two units, scaling to 6 units or 1.8 PB usable in a 42U rack. A9000R units share CPU, cache and access paths with their neighbours, leveraging a zero-tuning data distribution design. The FlashSystem A9000 family supports IBM Real-time Compression, real-time global deduplication and real-time pattern removal, while maintaining average access times of 250 μs under database workloads. Up to 144 instances of FlashSystem A9000 and XIV Storage Systems can be combined into one HyperScale cluster with client multitenancy. Since A9000, A9000R and XIV Storage Systems share the Spectrum Accelerate management software, the FlashSystem A9000R is occasionally referred to as XIV Gen4.

=== FlashSystem 900 and V9000 ===
==== FlashSystem V9000 ====
IBM FlashSystem V9000 is a 6U rackmount with up to 57 TB of usable storage capacity provided by FlashSystem 900 modules, managed by IBM Spectrum Virtualize software. The system supports a wide range of advanced data services such as IBM Real-time Compression and external storage virtualization. With scalability up to 456 TB of usable capacity (over 2 PB of effective capacity when using Real-time Compression), FlashSystem V9000 is targeted for mixed workload environments.

==== FlashSystem 900 ====
IBM FlashSystem 900 is composed of IBM enhanced MLC flash technology. The system is a 2U rackmount unit with up to 57TB of RAID-5, usable storage capacity. The system supports a high-availability architecture with redundant and hot-swappable components, IBM optimized ECC, IBM Variable Stripe RAID, and two-dimensional flash RAID for data protection. With read IOPS of 1,100,000 and write IOPS of 600,000, FlashSystem 900 is targeted for OLTP and OLAP databases.

On October 24, 2017 IBM announced an update to the FlashSystem 900 to add support for hardware-accelerated, inline data compression, but update loosened flash technology to 3D triple-level cell (TLC).

=== FlashSystem 840 and V840 ===
Both products were released in jan 2014 and were improved in May 2014 with new entry level capacity points and more protocols. Both models supports ECC, IBM Variable Stripe RAID, and two-dimensional flash RAID for data protection and offers hot-swap flash modules and power supplies. The systems also supports a wide range of software-defined storage services including: Real-time Compression, external storage virtualization, snapshots, replication, IBM Easy Tier, VAAI, and thin provisioning.

==== FlashSystem V840 ====
IBM FlashSystem V840 was a 6U rackmount with up to 40TB of usable storage capacity and targeted for workloads that need high velocity data access and advanced storage services. It is the predecessor of the FlashSystem V9000.

==== FlashSystem 840 ====
FlashSystem 840 was composed of enterprise multi-level cell (eMLC) flash technology and was a 2U rackmount unit with up to 48TB of usable storage capacity, 40TB with RAID 5. With read IOPS of 1,100,000 and write IOPS of 600,000, FlashSystem 840 is targeted for OLTP and OLAP databases, scientific applications and cloud services. It is the predecessor of the FlashSystem 900.

=== Early models ===
Specifications
Product	Machine Type / Model (MTM)	Capacity	Performance	Reliability	Efficiency	Marketing Withdrawn	Family
IBM FlashSystem A9000	9836-425, 9838-425					2020/02/11	XIV
IBM FlashSystem A9000	9836-415, 9838-415					2018/03/27	XIV
IBM FlashSystem A9000R	9835, 9837						XIV
IBM FlashSystem 9100	9110-AF7, 9150-AF8						Storwize
IBM FlashSystem V9000	9846/8-AC2, 9846/8-AE2	Up to 57 TB per building block, Up to 456 TB with full scale-out of control enclosures	Less than 200 μs min. latency up to 630,000 random read IOPS	Two-dimensional flash RAID with Variable Stripe RAID	6U rackspace	-	Storwize
IBM FlashSystem v840	9846/8-AC1, 9846/8-AE1	Up to 40 TB per building block, Up to 320 TB with full scale-out of control enclosures	Less than 200 μs min. latency up to 630,000 random read IOPS	Two-dimensional flash RAID with Variable Stripe RAID	6U rackspace	-	Storwize
IBM FlashSystem 900	9840-AE3, 9843-AE3, 9845-AE3	Up to 180 TB usable or 220 TB effective with RAID 5	Less than 155 μs min. latency up to 1,200,000 random read IOPS	Two-dimensional flash RAID with Variable Stripe RAID	2U rackspace, 625 Watts	2020/02/11	RamSan
IBM FlashSystem 900	9840-AE2, 9843-AE2, 9845-AE2	Up to 57 TB usable with RAID 5	Less than 155 μs min. latency up to 1,100,000 random read IOPS	Two-dimensional flash RAID with Variable Stripe RAID	2U rackspace, 625 Watts	2018/07/12	RamSan
IBM FlashSystem 840	9840-AE1, 9843-AE1	Up to 40 TB usable with RAID 5 (65 TB raw)	Less than 135 μs min. latency up to 1,100,000 random read IOPS	Two-dimensional flash RAID with Variable Stripe RAID	2U rackspace, 625 Watts	2015/06/02	RamSan
IBM FlashSystem 820	9831-AE2	Up to 20.6 TB usable with RAID 5 (33 TB raw)	Less than 160 μs min. latency up to 525,000 random read IOPS	Two-dimensional flash RAID with Variable Stripe RAID	1U rackspace, 300 Watts	2014/07/22	RamSan
IBM FlashSystem 720	9831-AS2	Up to 10.3 TB usable with RAID 5 (16.5 TB raw)	Less than 145 μs min. latency up to 525,000 random read IOPS	Two-dimensional flash RAID with Variable Stripe RAID	1U rackspace, 350 Watts	2014/03/28	RamSan
IBM FlashSystem 810	9830-AE1	Up to 10.3 TB usable (13.7 TB raw)	Less than 160 μs min. latency up to 550,000 random read IOPS	Variable Stripe RAID	1U rackspace, 350 Watts	2014/07/22	RamSan
IBM FlashSystem 710	9830-AS1	Up to 5.2 TB usable (6.9 TB raw)	Less than 145 μs min. latency up to 570,000 random read IOPS	Variable Stripe RAID	1U rackspace, 280 Watts	2014/03/28	RamSan

== See also ==
- IBM DS8000 and DS6000 series - Power-based storage series
