= Cluster IP =

A cluster IP is a term in cloud computing to refer to a proxy that represents a computer cluster with a single IP address. It is a term used by the cloud computing system Kubernetes (stylised as ClusterIP) to provide load balancing to IP addresses for devices in the internal network.
