= CDOT =

CDOT may refer to:

- \cdot – the LaTeX input for the dot operator (⋅)
- Centre for Development of Telematics, India
- Chicago Department of Transportation
- Clustered Data ONTAP, an operating system from NetApp
- Colorado Department of Transportation
- Connecticut Department of Transportation
- British Crown Dependencies and Overseas Territories
- Ċ – a letter of the Latin alphabet
