= Claudio Rodríguez Fer =

Spanish writer (born 1956)

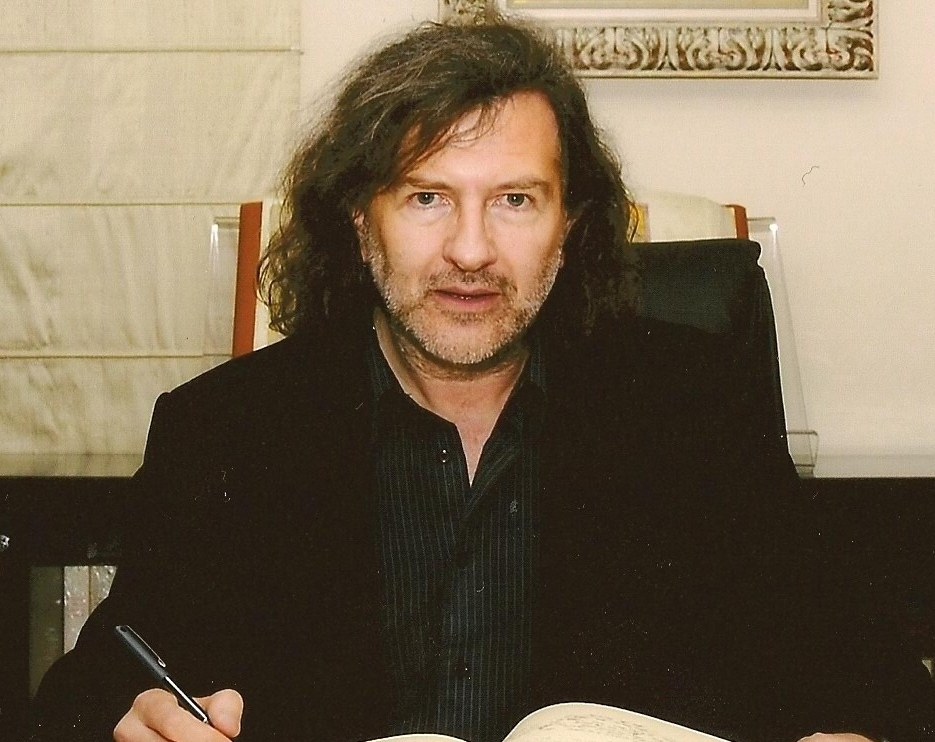
- Born: Claudio Rodríguez Fernández; 6 April 1956 (age 70); Lugo, Galicia, Spain
- Spouse: Carmen Blanco

Claudio Rodríguez Fernández (Lugo, Spain, 1956), better known as Claudio Rodríguez Fer, is a Galician writer. He is the author of numerous literary works (poetry, narrative, theatre and essay) in the Galician language and of works of modern literary studies in Spanish. He was a visiting professor at the City University of New York, University Paris Est Marne-La Vallèe at the University of Southern Brittany and at the Université Haute Bretagne at Rennes, where he was awarded the Doctor Honoris Causa. He is Director of the Chair José Ángel Valente of Poetry and Aesthetic at Universidade of Santiago de Compostela, where he also directs the Moenia magazine. With Carmen Blanco, he coordinates the intercultural and libertarian magazine Unión Libre. Cadernos de vida e culturas. He has published, spoken, and read his work in numerous parts of Europe, America and Africa.

Claudio Rodríguez Fer published his collected poems in Amores e clamores [Love and Cries; Ediciós do Castro, 2011] and his narrative in Contos e descontos [Stories and Not; Toxosoutos, 2011].

He grouped his poetry in thematic cycles: the erotic, in Vulva (1990), which includes Poemas de amor sen morte [Poems of Love Without Death; 1979], Tigres de ternura [Tender Tigers, 1981], Historia da lúa [Moon Story, 1984], A boca violeta [Violet Mouth, 1987] and Cebra [Zebra, 1988]; film, in Cinepoemas [Filmpoems, 1983]; music, in A muller sinfonía (Cancioneiro vital), 2018); historical themes, in the Memory Trilogy, comprising Lugo Blues [1987], A loita continúa [The Struggle Continues, 2004], and Ámote vermella [I Love You Red, 2009]; and the nomadic poems, which to date include Extrema Europa [1996], A unha muller desconocida [To an Unknown Woman, 1997], Viaxes a ti [Trips to You, 2006] and Unha tempada no paraíso [A Stay in Paradise, 2010], this last volume with an in-depth commentary by Olga Novo.

His critical work includes Poesía galega [Galician Poetry, 1989], Arte Literaria [1991], A literatura galega durante a guerra civil [Galician Literature During the Civil War, 1994], Acometida atlántica [Atlantic Attack, 1996], Guía de investigación literaria [1998] and numerous books and editions on the narrator Ánxel Fole and the poet José Ángel Valente, along with other Galician (Castelao, Dieste, Carballo, Ángel Johan, Cunqueiro) and non-Galician (Dostoevsky, Machado, Borges, Neruda, Cernuda) writers.

Translated to English in "Beyond and other poems", by Diana Conchado, Kathleen N. March, Julian Palley and Jonathan Dunne, Birmingham-Oxford, Galician Review, 3–4, 1999–2000, 105–132; in Entre duas augas, by Kathleen N. March, Santiago de Compostela, Amaranta Press, 2003, 13–23; in Contemporary Galician Poets ("An Old Man and a Boy (Revolutionary Project on Lugo Wall)" and "From Trace of Woman"), by Jonathan Dunne, A Poetry Review Supplement, Xunta de Galicia, 2010, 52–55; Tender Tigers, by Kathleen N. March, Noia, Editorial Toxosoutos, 2012; Rosalia's Revolution in New York, by Kathleen N. March, Santiago de Compostela, Santiago de Compostela, A tola soñando, 2014; Deathless Loves, by Diana Conchado and others, Santiago de Compostela, Edicións Follas Novas, 2015, and New York, New Poems, by Diana Conchado and Clifford Irizarry, Sofia, Small Stations Press, 2022.

In prose: An Anthology of Galician Short Stories. Así vai o conto, by Kathleen March, Lewiston-Queenston-Lampeter, Edwin Mellen Press, 1991, 144–149,

== Poetry ==
- Poemas de amor sen morte (1979)
- Tigres de ternura (1981), Tender Tigers (2012)
- Cinepoemas (1983)
- Historia da lúa (1984)
- A boca violeta (1987)
- Lugo blues (1987)
- Vulva (1990)
- Cebra (1991)
- A muller núa (1992)
- Extrema Europa (1996)
- A unha muller descoñecida (1997)
- Rastros de vida e poesía (2000)
- Moito máis que mil anos (2000)
- A vida. Gravados sobre corpo (2002)
- A loita continúa (2004)
- Viaxes a ti (2004), Voyages à toi (2008)
- Ámote vermella (2009)
- Unha tempada no paraíso (2010), Uma temporada no paraíso (2019)
- Amores e clamores (Poesía reunida) (2011)
- Terra extrema de radiación amorosa (2011)
- O cuarto bretón / La pièce bretonne (2014)
- Revolución rosaliana en Nova York / Rosalía's Revolution in New York (2014)
- Icebergs (Micropoemas reunidos) (2015)
- Ansia das alas / L'ansia di avere le ali (2015)
- Amores sen morte / Deathless Loves (2015)
- A cabeleira (Poema en 35 idiomas) (2015)
- A cabeleira (Poema en 60 idiomas) (2016)
- Os amores profundos / Les amours profonds (2016)
- Anarquista o nada (Poemas de la memoria libertaria) (2016)
- A cabeleira multilingüe (Poema en 65 idiomas) (2017)
- Pai meu (Amén, camarada) (Poema en 8 idiomas) (2017), 11 (2019), 16 (2020)
- Limiares sen límites / Πύλες απειράριθμες (2017)
- A muller sinfonía (Cancioneiro vital) 2018)
- Corpoética (catálogo de exposición) 2018)
- Diálogos imposibles / Dialogues impossibles (2018)
- Criptografías (2018)
- Máis alá do bosque / Dincolo de pădure (2018)
- Beleza ou barbarie / Bellesa o barbàrie (2019)
- A viaxe vermella (María Casares) (Poema en 11 idiomas) (2021)
- ADN do infinito (2021), DNA do infinito (2024)
- Nova York, Novos Poemas / New York, New Poems (2022)
- A cabeleira (Poema en 70 idiomas) (2023)

== Prose ==
- Meta-relatos (1988)
- A muller loba (1993)
- Belas e bestas (2002)
- O muiñeiro misterioso (2005)
- A bela mestra (2005)
- Os paraísos eróticos (2010)
- Contos e descontos (Narrativa completa) (2011)

== Essay ==
- A Galicia misteriosa de Ánxel Fole (1981)
- Antonio Machado e Galicia (1989)
- Poesía galega (1989)
- Arte literaria (1991)
- José Ángel Valente (1992)
- Comentarios de textos contemporáneos (1992)
- Comentarios de textos populares e de masas (1994)
- A literatura galega durante a guerra civil (1994)
- Material Valente (1994)
- Acometida atlántica. Por un comparatismo integral (1996)
- Ánxel Fole. Vida e obra (1997)
- O mundo lucense de Ánxel Fole (1997)
- Ánxel Fole. Unha fotobiografía (1997)
- Guía de investigación literaria (1998)
- Borges dende o labirinto galego (2008)
- Valente: el fulgor y las tinieblas (2008)
- Meus amores celtas (2010)
- Valente vital (Galicia, Madrid, Oxford) (2012)
- Borges y todo (Escepticismo y otros laberintos) (2013, 2023)
- Valente vital (Ginebra, Saboya, París) (2014)
- Valente vital (Magreb, Israel, Almería) (2017)
- Valente infinito (Libertad creativa y conexiones interculturales) (2018)
- Valente epistolar (Correspondencia de José Ángel Valente con sus amistades) (2022)
- Santiago Marcos, poeta topo contra el fascismo (2023)
- Poetas concatenados: Cavafis, Cernuda, Valente y Gamoneda (2024)

== Edition and Introduction ==
- Contos de lobos, by Ánxel Fole (1985, 1989)
- Cántigas de alén, by José Ángel Valente (1987, 1989, 1996)
- Con pólvora e magnolias, by Xosé Luís Méndez Ferrín (1989)
- Os eidos, by Uxío Novoneyra (1990)
- Guerra literaria, by Rafael Dieste (1991)
- Verbas de chumbo, by Castelao (1992)
- Poesía perdida, by Ricardo Carballo Calero (1993)
- Obras reunidas, by Ángel Johán (1993)
- Cartafolio galego, by Ánxel Fole (1996)
- Obra galega completa, by Ánxel Fole (1997)
- A lenda do Grande Inquisidor, by Fyodor Dostoevsky (1998)
- Cuaderno de versiones, by José Ángel Valente (2001)
- Cima del canto, by José Ángel Valente (2002)
- Obra literaria completa, by Ánxel Fole (2003)
- Obras completas II. Ensayos, by José Ángel Valente (2002)
- Ensayos sobre José Ángel Valente, de Juan Goytisolo (2009)
- Musgo / Moss, de Emily Dickinson, with translation to Galician (2015)
