= College of San Jose =

Coordinates: 38°33′57.77″N 6°20′10.43″W

College of San Jose Villafranca de los Barros
- Villafranca de los Barros, Badajoz, Spain

Information
- Type: Jesuit, Catholic
- Established: 1893; 133 years ago
- Director: Jaime Torralba Gómez
- Staff: 120
- Grades: Primary through baccalaureate
- Gender: Coeducational
- Enrollment: 750
- Website: www.sanjosecolegio.org

College of San Jose is an educational institution in Villafranca de los Barros, Spain. It was founded by the Society of Jesus in 1893. It includes primary through baccalaureate, as well as a student residence for men and women. Special activities include artistic-training, volunteering and solidarity projects, and pilgrimages. It received silver quality certification from EFQM.

Enrollment has risen to 750 students (448 male, 294 female), with 182 full-time residents. Total staff numbers 111, including 2 Jesuits.

== Notable alumni ==
- Guillermo Fernández Vara - politician
- Carlos Jean - DJ
- Rafael Sánchez Ferlosio - escritor
- César Cernuda - presidente Microsoft LATAM

== See also ==
- List of Jesuit sites
