= Kothala =

- Village
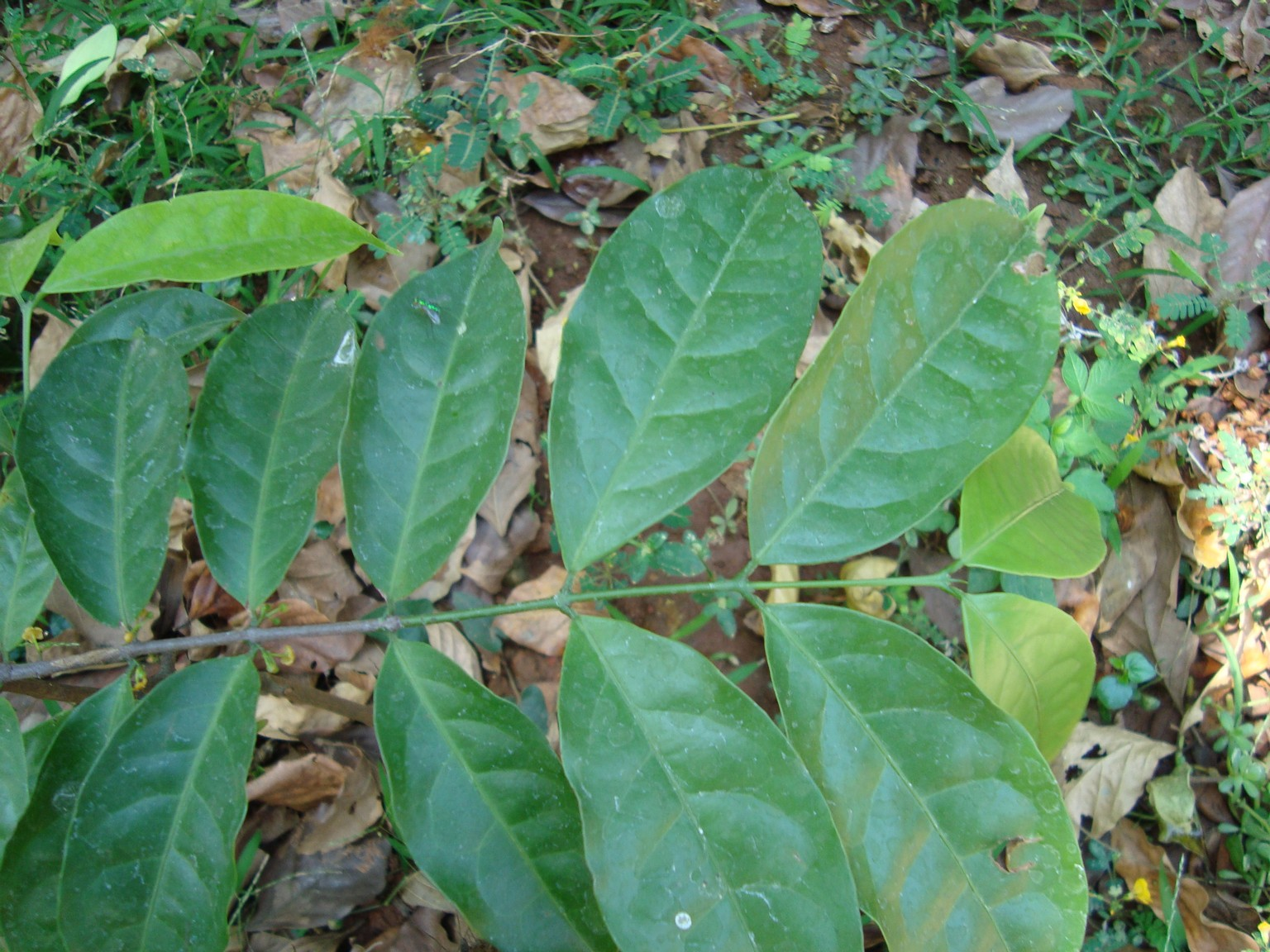
- Kothala Himbutu
- Interactive map of Kothala
- Coordinates: 9.5646116°N 76.6646576°E
- Country: India
- State: Kerala
- District: Kottayam

Languages
  - Official: Malayalam, English
- Time zone: UTC+5:30 (IST)
- PIN: 686502
- Telephone code: 91 481
- Vehicle registration: KL

Kothala is a village 21 km east of Kottayam in Kerala, Southern India. National highway 220 passes through Kothala village. It is located 3 km from Pampady. Elamkavu Devi Temple is located in the center of Kothala village. Poet Viduan V.T. Ipe was born here.

== Etymology ==
The name Kothala is derived from the words kō(royal) and tala (head) meaning capital. The village lies mostly within Kooropada panchayath boundaries and little in the eastern part of Pampady panchayath. Vellakkallumkal is a reputed family in Kothala and they have a family temple also. Gandharvaswamy Temple.

== Schools ==
C.M.S LPS Nenmala is the oldest educational institution in this village. N.S.S. HS Kothala situated at Parayarkunnu is a prominent school in the village right now. Kothala Chira is the perennial water source of this village. Panthakkallu and Poochakallu are the noted geographical formations of the Kothala village. Toddy shops are located in Vattukalam junction and important one near Kandam Bazar Junction in NH 220.
