= George Kurian (businessman) =

Indian-American businessperson (born 1966)

- Born: 1966 (age 59–60); Pampady, Kerala, India
- Education: Princeton University (BSE); Stanford University (MBA)
- Occupation: Chief executive officer
- Employer: NetApp
- Title: CEO and Board Member of NetApp
- Predecessor: Tom Georgens
- Board member of: NetApp
- Spouse: Married
- Children: 2
- Relatives: Thomas Kurian (brother)

George Kurian is an American business executive. He is the current chief executive officer and a member of the board of NetApp. Prior to this, he was the executive vice president of product operations at NetApp.

== Early life and education ==
Kurian was born to P. C. Kurian and his wife Molly in 1966 in Pampady village of Kottayam district in Kerala, India. Kurian senior was a chemical engineer and the general manager of Graphite India. Kurian was one among four brothers including his identical twin and Google Cloud CEO, Thomas Kurian.

As their father's career involved moving around India, the twins boarded at the Jesuit-run St Joseph's Boys' High School in Bangalore. Both were accepted to the university IIT Madras. There they both took SAT tests and sent the results to various colleges, including Princeton University, which offered both of them partial scholarship places. At the age of 17, along with Thomas Kurian, he moved to the United States. George Kurian is a 1995 graduate of Stanford Graduate School of Business. He also holds an electrical engineering degree from Princeton University.

== Career ==
Kurian worked as a valet, pizza chef and bartender in college.

His career in tech included the role of vice president at Akamai Technologies, management consulting at McKinsey & Company, and leading Software Engineering and Product Management teams at Oracle Corporation.

=== NetApp Inc. ===
Kurian joined NetApp in 2011 as senior vice president of its storage solutions group. He was promoted to executive vice president (EVP) for product operations in 2013. He was promoted to chief executive officer in 2015.

Kurian received a base salary of $9,491,210 as chief executive officer and director at NetApp in 2020.

== Personal life ==
Kurian is married and is a father of two. He resides in the San Francisco Bay Area.
