= Cernuda =

Cernuda is a Spanish surname. Notable people with the surname include:

- César Cernuda, Spanish business executive
- José García Cernuda (1888–1977), Spanish politician and sports leader
- Julio Cernuda (1920–1999), Argentine alpine skier
- Luis Cernuda (1902–1963), Spanish poet
