= Thomas Kurian =

Indian-American businessman (born 1966)

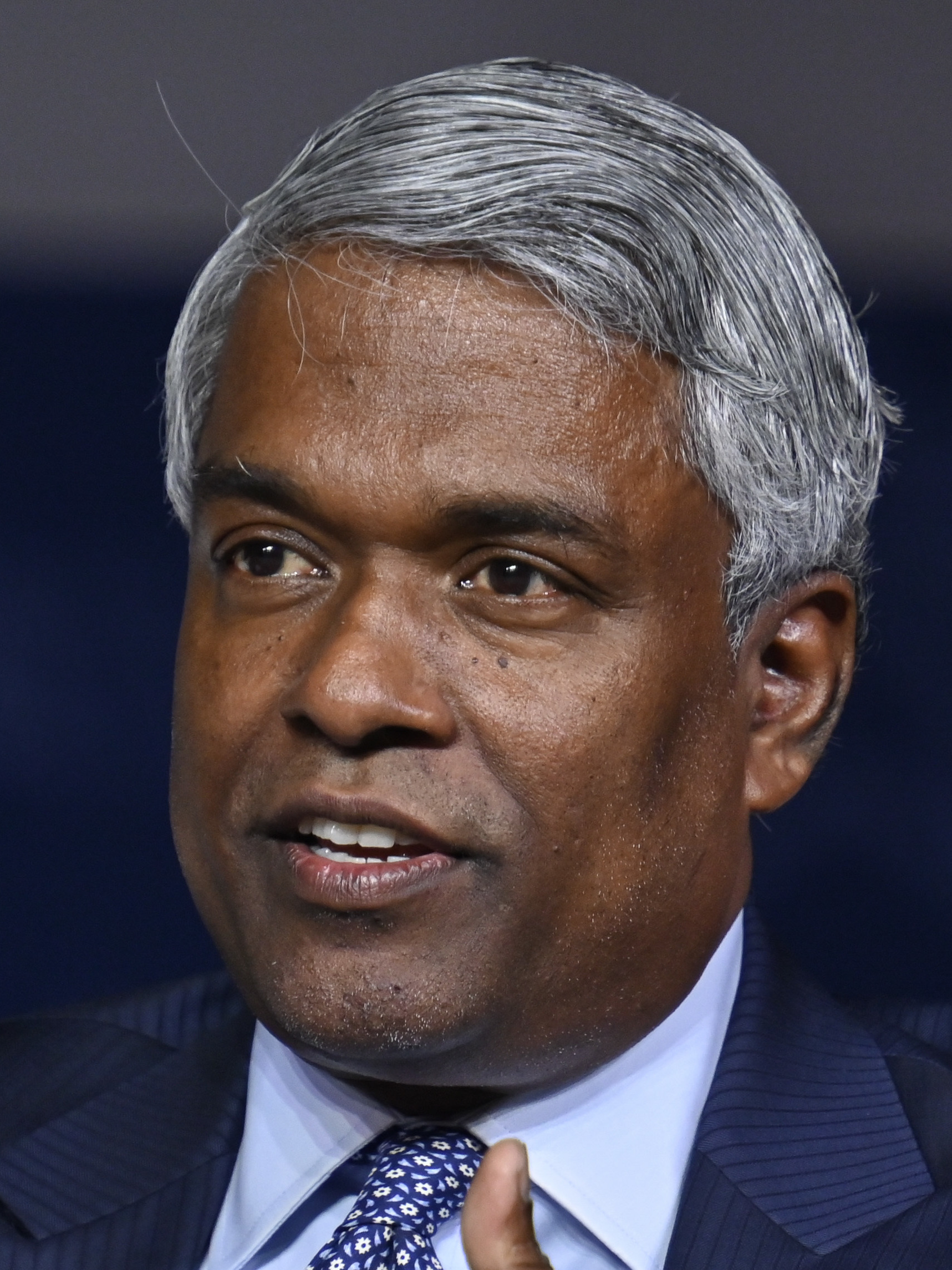
- Kurian in 2022
- Born: 1966 (age 59–60); Pampady, Kerala, India
- Education: Princeton University (BSE); Stanford University (MBA)
- Title: CEO of Google Cloud Platform
- Relatives: George Kurian (brother)

Thomas Kurian (born 1966) is an Indian-American business executive and Chief Executive Officer of Google Cloud (under Alphabet Inc.) since 2019.

== Early life and education ==
Thomas Kurian was born to P. C. Kurian and his wife Molly in 1966 in Pampady village of Kottayam district in Kerala, India. Kurian senior was a chemical engineer and the general manager of Graphite India. Thomas Kurian was one among four brothers including his identical twin George Kurian, who became the CEO of NetApp in 2015.

As their father's career involved moving around India, the twins boarded at the Jesuit-run St Joseph's Boys' High School in Bangalore. Both were accepted to the university IIT Madras. There they both took SAT tests and sent the results to various colleges, including Princeton University, which offered both of them partial scholarship places. At the age of 17, along with George Kurian, he moved to the United States. Kurian graduated from Princeton with a bachelor's degree in electrical engineering, from which he graduated summa cum laude.

== McKinsey and Stanford ==
After Princeton, Kurian started his career with McKinsey & Company as a consultant serving clients in the software, telecommunications, and financial services industries for 6 years in London and Brussels. He also pursued an MBA from Stanford Graduate School of Business.

== Oracle ==
Kurian joined Oracle in 1996, initially holding various product management and development positions. His first executive role was as Vice President of Oracle's e-Business division. In this role, he drove a number of company-wide initiatives focused on transforming Oracle into an e-Business.

Next Kurian took responsibility for the Oracle Fusion Middleware product family.

Later, Kurian served as a Senior Vice President of Oracle's Server Technologies Division responsible for the development and delivery of Oracle Application Servers. He played a key role in bringing Oracle 9i application server to market. Application server software became Oracle's fastest-growing business primarily because of his efforts. Kurian served as a member of Oracle's executive committee for 13 years. He led 35,000-people software development team in 32 countries with an R&D budget of $4 billion. He also helped in the transformation of Oracle's products with the introduction of leading suite of Cloud Services, led 60 software acquisitions and Oracle's 45 Cloud data centres.

As the President of Product Development, he oversaw Oracle's 3,000-odd product development efforts. He was responsible for development and delivery of Oracle's software product portfolio including Oracle Database, Oracle Fusion Middleware, and ERP, CRM, and supply chain management applications.

Thomas Kurian was the 18th highest-paid man in the U.S. in 2010, according to CNN. He was also the fifth highest-paid tech executive in 2010.

On September 6, 2018, Kurian announced he was taking extended time off from the company. Kurian and Larry Ellison reportedly had a falling out over the direction of its cloud business.

On September 28, 2018, he resigned as president of product development at Oracle.

== Google ==
Kurian joined Google's Cloud organization in November 2018. During his first year at Google, Kurian focused on selling G Suite applications to enterprise clients. He has reorganized the sales team to align with Sales practices of enterprise clients.

== Awards and recognition ==
In 2024, Kurian was included in Gold House's A100 Most Impactful Asians List.
