= Olga Novo =

Spanish painter

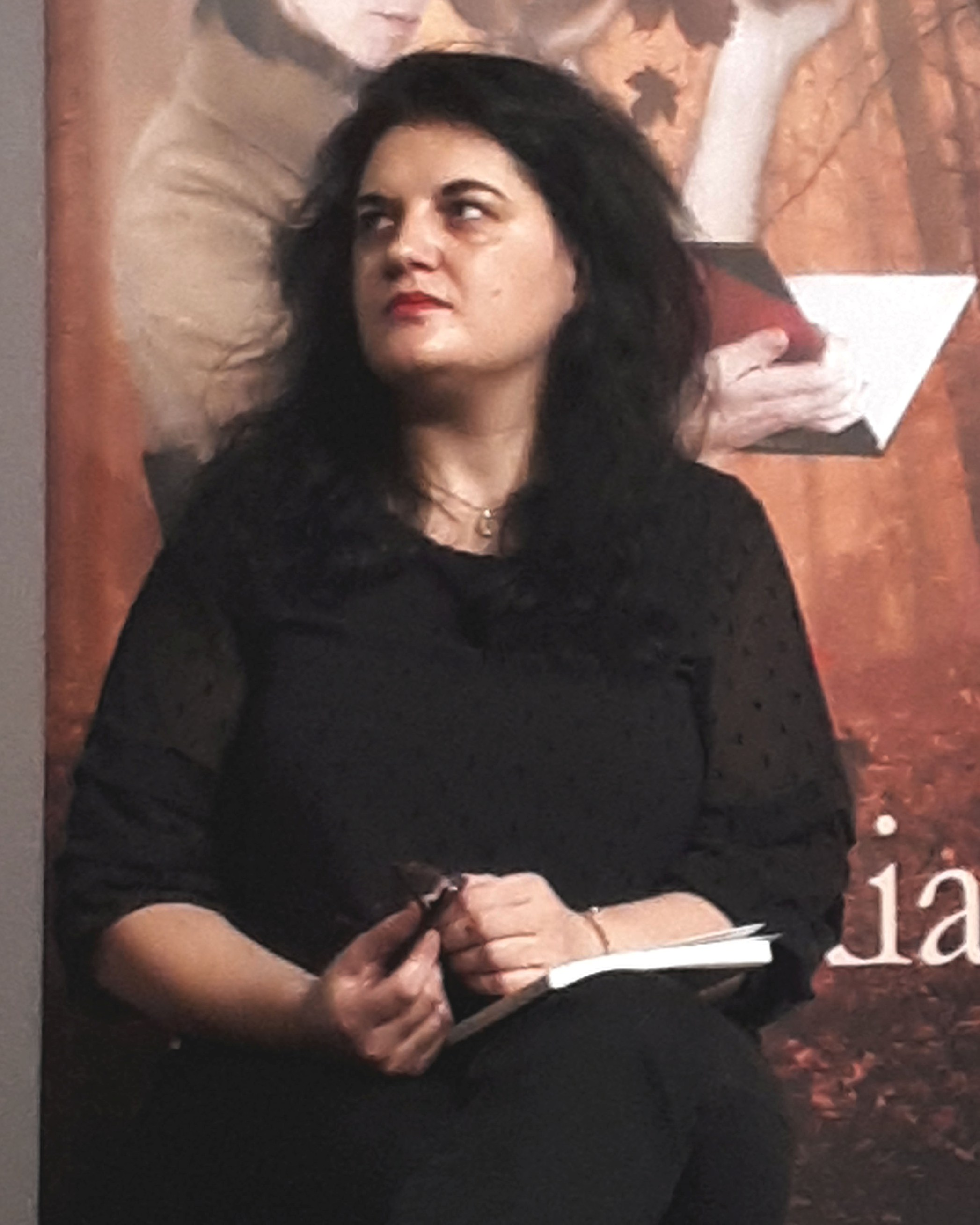
Olga Novo

Olga Novo (born 1975 in Vilarmao, A Pobra do Brollón) is a Galician poet and essayist.

She studied Galician Philology at the University of Santiago de Compostela and was a high school teacher in several Galician centres, and a Galician literature professor at the University of Southern Brittany, in Lorient.

She has published her works and essays in several publications (Festa da Palabra Silenciada, Dorna, Xistral, El País, ABC…).

== Works ==
Magnalia, with the painter Alexandra Domínguez and the poet Xoán Abeleira.

=== Poetry ===
- A teta sobre o sol (1996)
- Nós nus (1997)
- A cousa vermella (2004)
- Cráter (2011)

=== Essay ===
- Por un vocabulario galego do sexo. A terminoloxía erótica de Claudio Rodriguez Fer (1995)
- O lume vital de Claudio Rodriguez Fer (1999, 2008)
- Uxío Novoneyra. Lingua loaira (2005)
- Introdución a Unha tempada no paraíso de Claudio Rodríguez Fer (2010)
- Erótica Medieval Galaica (2013)
- No principio foi o pracer (2017)

=== Translations ===
- El contradiscurso de las mujeres. Historia del proceso feminista, by Carmen Blanco.

== Prizes ==
- Ánxel Fole Award of research Uxío Novoneyra. Lingua loaira.
- Losada Diéguez Award, Nós nus.
