= David Hitz =

American engineer

- Education: Swarthmore College; Deep Springs College; Princeton University
- Occupation: EVP of NetApp
- Known for: Co-founder of NetApp
- Website: David Hitz

David Hitz is an American engineer. In 1992, he, James Lau, and Michael Malcolm founded NetApp, where he became an executive vice president.

A graduate of Deep Springs College, Hitz earned a BSE from Princeton University and went on to work as an engineer at MIPS Computer Systems and as a senior engineer at Auspex Systems.

He is co-recipient (with James Lau) of the 2007 IEEE Reynold B. Johnson Information Storage Systems Award.

In February 2019, Hitz announced his retirement as executive vice president of NetApp.
