= Dieste =

Dieste is a Spanish surname. Notable people with the surname include:

- Eladio Dieste (1917–2000), Uruguayan engineer
- Rafael Dieste (1899–1981), Galician poet, philosopher and short-story writer
