= Gamoneda =

Gamoneda is a surname. Notable people with the surname include:

- Ana Luisa Carvajal Gamoneda (born 1962), Cuban chess player
- Antonio Gamoneda (born 1931), Spanish poet

== See also ==
- Gamoneda Formation, an Emsian geologic formation of southern Bolivia
