= José Ángel Valente =

Spanish poet

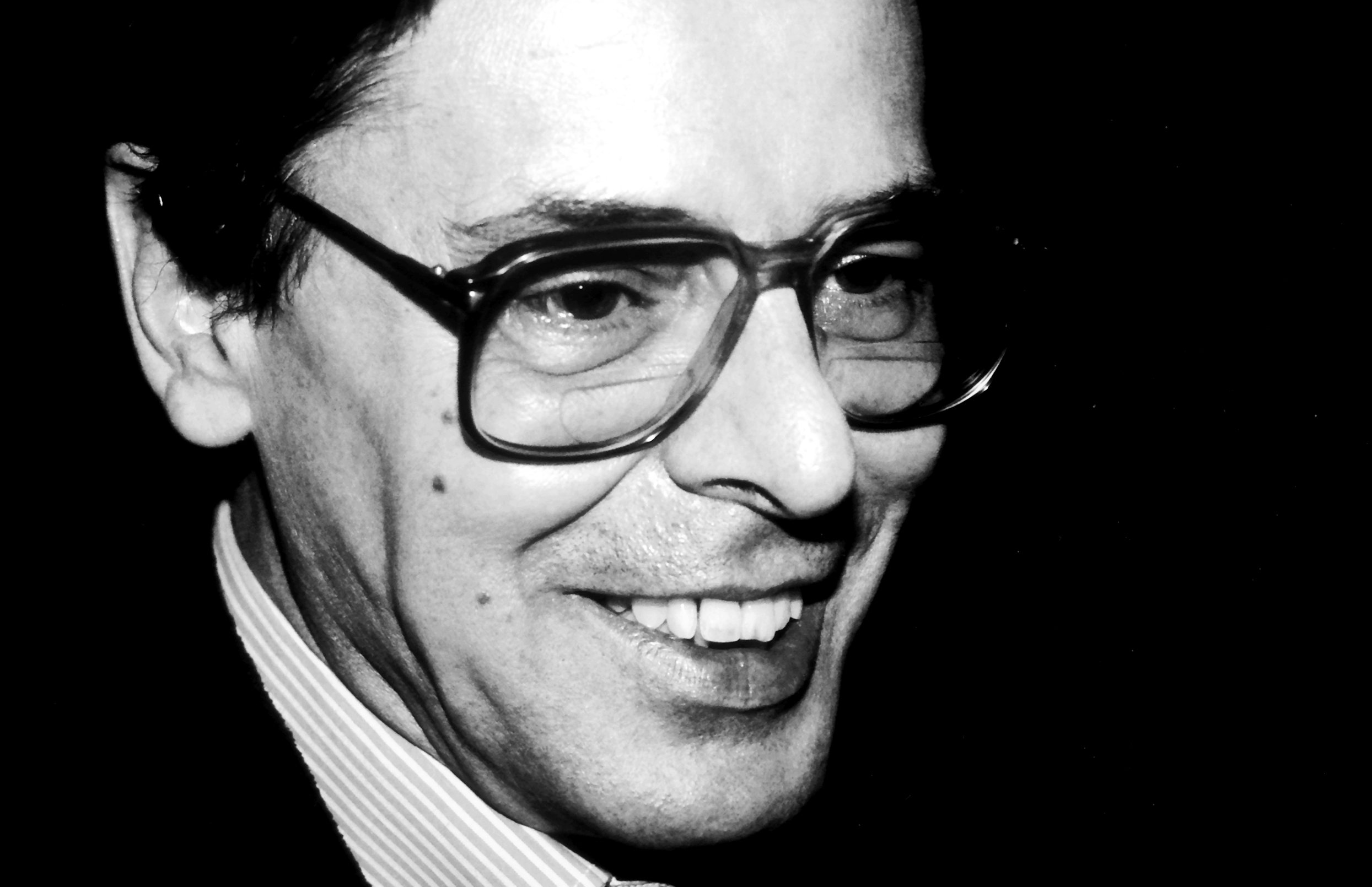

José Ángel Valente Docasar (25 April 1929, Ourense, Galicia, Spain — 18 July 2000, Geneva, Switzerland) was a Spanish poet of the Generation of '50, an essayist, and a translator, who wrote in Spanish and Galician.

He studied at the Faculty of Law at the University of Santiago de Compostela, at the Faculty of Romance Philology at the University Complutense, taught Spanish philology at Oxford. From 1958 he lived in Switzerland, after 1980 he divided his time between Spain, Switzerland and France. In 1972, he was accused by the Franco government of insulting the honor of the Spanish army.

One of the greatest Spanish poets of the second half of the 20th century. Prize winner of the Pablo Iglesias Posse Foundation (1984), Princess of Asturias Awards (1988), Queen Sofia (1998). The Department of Poetics and Aesthetics at the University of Santiago de Compostela is named after Jose Angel Valente.
