= Auspex Systems =

- Industry: Computer data storage
- Founded: 1987
- Founder: Larry Boucher
- Defunct: 2003
- Headquarters: Santa Clara, California
- Products: Network-attached storage devices

Auspex Systems was a computer data storage company founded in 1987 by Larry Boucher, who was previously CEO of Adaptec. It was headquartered in Santa Clara, California.

Auspex introduced the first network-attached storage (NAS) devices. After an initial public offering in 1993, shares were traded on the NASDAQ exchange under symbol ASPX. One of the unique features of their systems was the ease with which volumes could be transparently mirrored and migrated between physical disks. Auspex systems used Functional Multiprocessing, essentially Asymmetric multiprocessing, that allowed the systems to scale functions independently -- such as networking, file processing, or storage processing. There was a Host Processor running Unix that controlled the whole system. This 'system within a system' could even be rebooted without interrupting file servicing. They became a leading provider of data center storage in the mid-1990s but fell behind NetApp in the field. Early cabinet rack models held sets of 3-4GB disks the size of small shoeboxes. Bruce N. Moore joined in 1995 as president and chief executive officer. Boucher left the company in 1997 to found Alacritech.

Their 4Front or NS2000 model, initially offered in 1999 as a stackable system, held drawers of disks and was plagued by Mylex RAID controller issues which contributed to their bankruptcy in June 2003. Their last product, the NSc3000, was the first multi-vendor SAN-NAS gateway and essentially kept the same NAS front-end but could connect via Fibre Channel to any SAN disk array. After the burst of the dot-com bubble, in February, 2000, the company worked with Regent Pacific to select Gary J. Sbona as interim chief executive. When the company was liquidated in 2003, its patent portfolio was acquired by NetApp and its services business went to GlassHouse Technologies for about $280,000.
