= Pampady =

Town in Kerala, Southern India

- Town
- Interactive map of Pampady
- Coordinates: 9.566667°N 76.66667°E
- Country: India
- State: Kerala
- District: Kottayam

Area
  - Total: 31.08 km^{2} (12.00 sq mi)
- Elevation: 81 m (266 ft)

Population (2011)
  - Total: 35,627
  - Density: 1,146/km^{2} (2,969/sq mi)

Languages
  - Official: Malayalam, English
- Time zone: UTC+5:30 (IST)
- PIN: 686502
- Telephone code: 91 0481
- Vehicle registration: KL 05

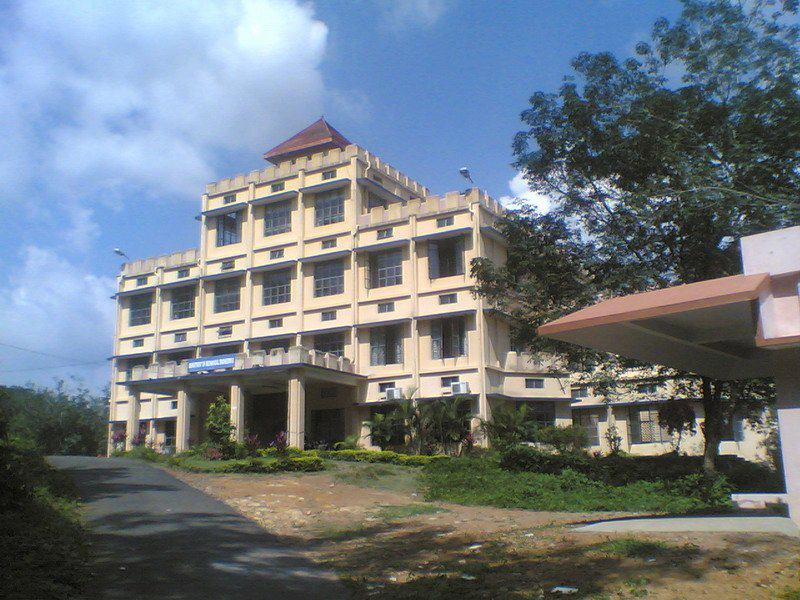
Engineering College

Pampady is a large town in the Kottayam district of Kerala, India. It is situated midway between the backwaters of western Kerala and the mountains of the Western Ghats.

== Notable people ==
- George Kurian, CEO of NetApp
- Thomas Kurian, business manager and CEO of Google Cloud
- Baiju N Nair, journalist
- Ponkunnam Varkey, writer
