= José García Cernuda =

Spanish politician and sports leader

- Born: José García-Cernuda Estrada-Nora; 17 March 1888; Madrid, Spain
- Died: 9 February 1977 (aged 88); Oviedo, Asturias, Spain
- Citizenship: Spanish
- Occupations: Politician; sports leader
- Known for: Manager of the Spain national football team

President of the Royal Spanish Hockey Federation
- Incumbent
- Assumed office 1918

Vice president of Atlético Madrid

José María García-Cernuda Estrada de Nora (17 March 1888 – 2 September 1977) was a Spanish politician and sports leader. He was a president of the Royal Spanish Hockey Federation, a vice president of the Spanish football club Atlético Madrid, and the manager of the Spain national football team between 1923 and 1924. Cernuda was a member of the National Catholic Association of Propagandists and a civil governor of both Guadalajara and Gipuzkoa during the dictatorship of Primo de Rivera.

== Early and personal life ==
José María García-Cernuda was born on 17 March 1888 in Madrid, as the son of José García-Cernuda Miranda (1850–?) and María del Carmen Teresa Estrada de Nora Alvarez (1852–1931), the second Marquesa de los Altares, daughter of Saturnino Calleja, owner of Editorial Calleja. He married Isabel Calleja Gutiérrez, and the couple had five children, José María, Fernando, María Teresa, Isabel María, and Luis García-Cernuda Calleja.

== Political career ==
From a very young age, Cernuda was interested in politics, soon joining the Conservative Youth, thus taking conservative positions politically. Due to his great eloquence, he was a regular at the rallies and conferences of the Maurist Party, becoming one of the main leaders of Maurism and a member of its Central Committee. Thus, in the 1918 elections, he entered the City Council of Madrid with five councilors from his party, and under the mandate of the Count of Limpies, he was appointed deputy mayor. On 25 April 1919, in an ordinary plenary session held at the Madrid City Council, the deputy mayor José García Cernuda, of the Maurist Party, proposed that the Council expressed "its satisfaction to the illustrious Madame Curie" following the overwhelmingly positive reception and credit that Spanish scientists were giving to Marie Curie during her first visit to Spain, with Cernuda asking for her to be granted the Grand Cross of Alfonso, which was approved unanimously.

Due to his honesty, he had strong disputes in the City Council, both against the opposition and within his own party. In this way, in December 1920, after a strong discussion, even coming to blows, he requested his resignation as deputy mayor irrevocably.

== Sporting career ==
In 1918, Cernuda was the first president of the Spanish Hockey Federation, one of the oldest federations from the first federated Spanish sport. In the 1922–23 season, he was called by Julián Ruete, the then president of Athletic de Madrid, to become vice president of the club, replacing Manuel Ansoleaga. Shortly after, on 22 June 1923, he was appointed general secretary of the Royal Spanish Football Federation (RFEF). Continuing his immersion in Sports Law, at the Assembly on 26 March 1923 held in Bilbao, the delegates of the Hockey Federation elected him as president of the committee, where he remained until 1935. The first legal statutes and definitive agreements were approved under his mandate, actively intervening in the constitution of the International Hockey Federation.

Between 1923 and 1924, he was a member of the selection committee that was in charge of selecting the squad of the Spain national team, and together with Pedro Parages, he led the nation in just two friendly matches that ended in a 3–0 victory over Portugal in Seville, and in a goalless draw with Italy in Milan.

== Later life ==
At the beginning of April 1924, Cernuda was elected Civil Governor of Guadalajara, for which he immediately resigned from the position he held at the Royal Spanish Football Federation. However, the National Committee, understanding that the proximity of Guadalajara to the city of Madrid did not represent any obstacle, chose not to accept said request and Cernuda was thus able to continue at RFEF. He was then transferred to the Civil Government of Guipúzcoa in November 1924, where he remained in office until 2 February 1926.

Once he was no longer governor, Cernuda intensified his political side, being fined and imprisoned on several occasions. In September 1924, together with his friend José Calvo Sotelo, he left the Maurist Party, later joining the Spanish Renovation in Asturias, becoming one of its leaders along with Calvo Sotelo himself, Serrano Jover and Goicoechea. Cernuda was also a general secretary of Popular Action in Asturias.

After the murder of his friend and, fearing for his life, Cernuda had to take refuge in the Mexican embassy at the beginning of the Spanish Civil War. However, he did not consent to be evacuated, since his wife Isabel Calleja had been detained. At the end of the Civil War, he continued to practice his work as a lawyer, being one of the most prestigious jurists in the capital, to the point that the Illustrious Bar Association of Madrid awarded him the Plaque of Honor for his 50 years of profession. In 1974, Cernuda was awarded the silver medal for Sports Merit for being one of the first directors of federated Spanish sports.

== Death ==
Cernuda died in Oviedo, Asturias, on 2 September 1977, at the age of 89.
