= Rafael Dieste =

Galician poet, philosopher, short-story writer and dramatist

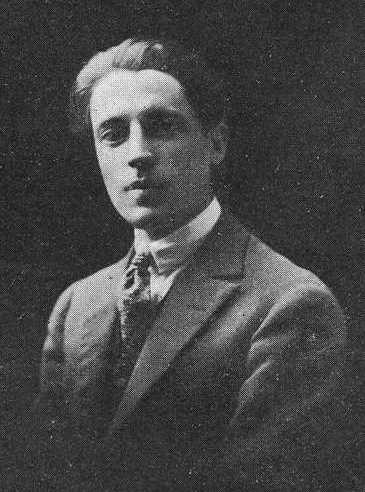
- 1926 portrait from Vida Gallega.
- Born: 1899; Rianxo
- Died: 1981 (aged 81–82); Santiago de Compostela
- Occupations: Poet, philosopher, short-story writer, and dramatist
- Writing career
- Language: Galician and Spanish
- Subject: Aesthics
- Notable work: Nuevo retablo de las maravillas

Rafael Dieste (Rianxo, 1899–Santiago de Compostela, 1981) was a Galician poet, philosopher, short-story writer, and dramatist writing mostly in Galician language, but also in Spanish language. He began to write with the encouragement of another Galician poet, Manuel Antonio, wrote for the theatre and wrote widely on aesthics. His stories have been compared to the other-world approach of the graphic art of M. C. Escher.

His nephew was the Uruguayan structural architect Eladio Dieste, whose approach to architecture may have been in sympathy with his uncle's poetry.

== Selected works ==
- Nuevo retablo de las maravillas (1937; The New Marvelous Puppet Show)
- Viaje, duelo y perdición: tragedia, humorada y comedia. 1979
- Viaje y fin de Frontán
- A fiestra baldeira, 1927-1958
- Dos arquivos do trasno, 1926
