= NetApp =

American technology company

NetApp, Inc.
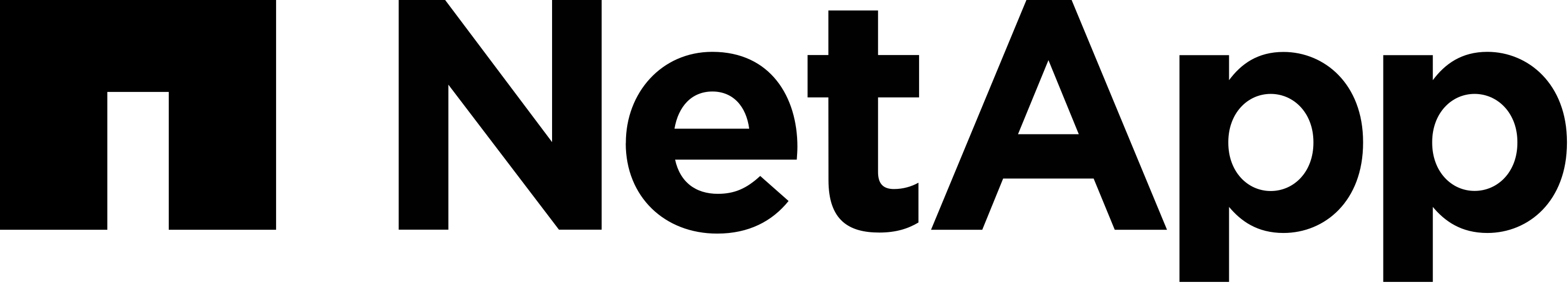
- Formerly: Network Appliance, Inc. (1992–2008)
- Type: Public
- Traded as: Nasdaq: NTAP; S&P 500 component
- Industry: Cloud computing; Storage device
- Founded: 1992; 34 years ago
- Founders: David Hitz; James Lau; Michael Malcolm
- Headquarters: San Jose, California, U.S.
- Area served: Worldwide
- Key people: George Kurian (CEO); César Cernuda (president); Mike Nevens (chairman)
- Products: Servers; SAN storage; NAS storage; Networking; Software
- Revenue: ▲US$6.57 billion (2025)
- Operating income: ▲US$1.34 billion (2025)
- Net income: ▲US$1.19 billion (2025)
- Total assets: ▲US$10.8 billion (2025)
- Total equity: ▼US$1.04 billion (2025)
- Number of employees: 11,700 (2025)
- Website: www.netapp.com
- Footnotes; Financials as of April 25, 2025.

NetApp, Inc. is an American data infrastructure company that provides unified data storage, integrated data services, and cloud operations (CloudOps) solutions to enterprise customers. The company is based in San Jose, California. It was ranked in the Fortune 500 from 2012 to 2021. Founded in 1992 with an initial public offering in 1995, NetApp offers cloud data services for management of applications and data both online and physically.

== History ==
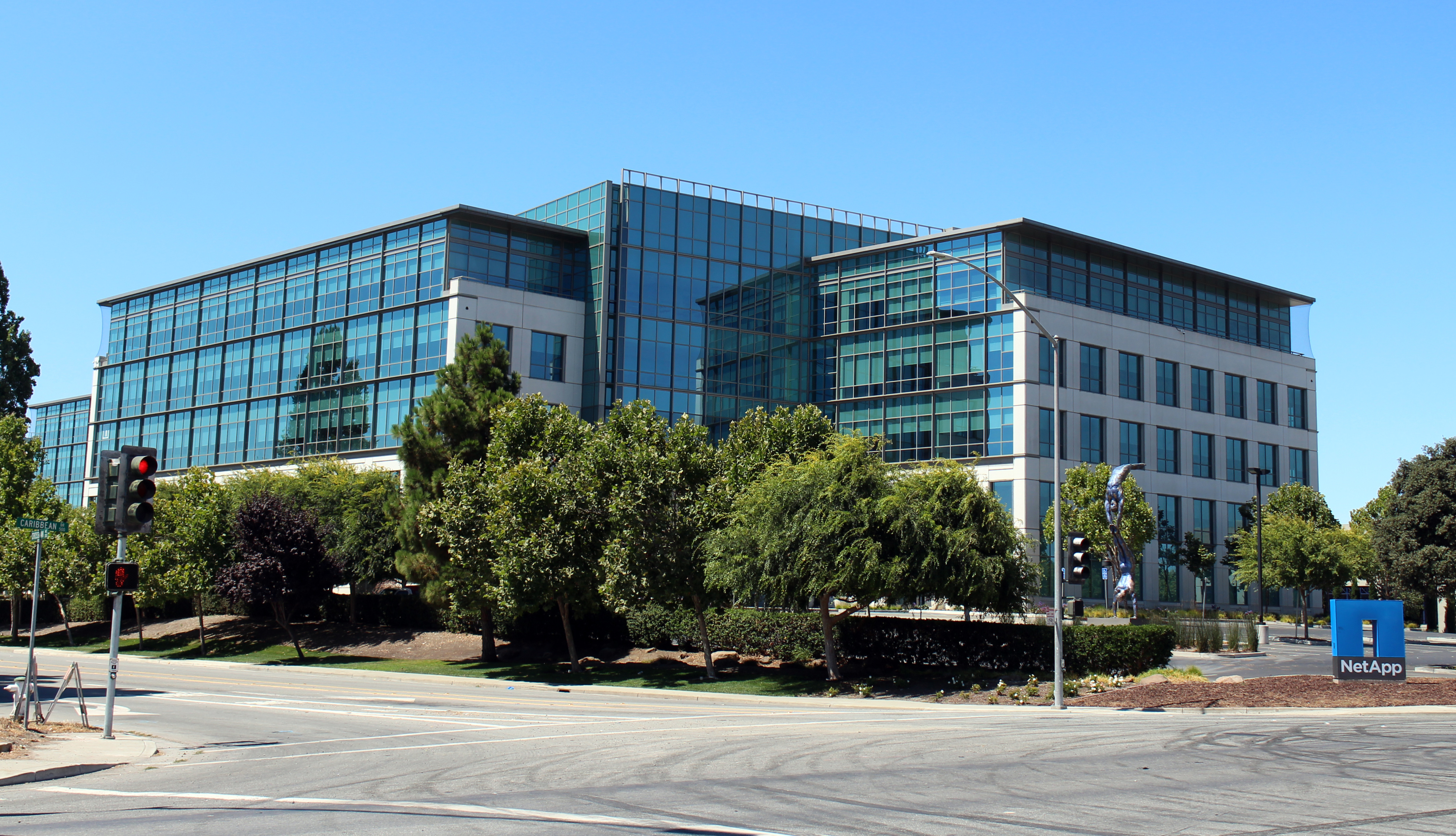
Former headquarters in Sunnyvale (which later became home to Walmart's West Coast office hub)

NetApp was founded in 1992 by David Hitz, James Lau, and Michael Malcolm as Network Appliance, Inc. At the time, its major competitor was Auspex Systems. In 1994, NetApp received venture capital funding from Sequoia Capital. In 2006, NetApp sold the NetCache product line to Blue Coat Systems. In 2008, Network Appliance officially changed its legal name to NetApp, Inc., reflecting the nickname by which it was already well-known. On June 1, 2015, Tom Georgens stepped down as CEO and was replaced by George Kurian. In May 2018, NetApp announced its first end-to-end NVMe array called All Flash FAS A800 with the release of ONTAP 9.4 software.

== Organization ==
George Kurian is the chief executive officer of NetApp and a member of the board of directors. He joined the company in 2011. The president of NetApp is César Cernuda. In December 2009, Mike Nevens was appointed as chairman of the board. The company employs around 12,000 people worldwide.

== Competition ==
Former NetApp logo

NetApp competes in the computer data storage hardware industry. In 2009, NetApp ranked second in market capitalization in its industry behind EMC Corporation, now Dell EMC, and ahead of Seagate Technology, Western Digital, Brocade, Imation, and Quantum. In total revenue of 2009, NetApp ranked behind EMC, Seagate, Western Digital, and ahead of Imation, Brocade, Xyratex, and Hutchinson Technology. According to a 2014 IDC report, NetApp ranked second in the network storage industry "Big 5's list", behind EMC (Dell), and ahead of IBM, HP and Hitachi.

== Partnerships ==
On March 1, 2021, a partnership with the Aston Martin F1 Team was announced. NetApp is currently responsible for data provision and cloud services for the racing team. Similar partnerships have been in place with the MotoGP team Ducati Corse since 2018, and the TAG Heuer Porsche Formula E Team since July 2022.

== OEM ==
September 13, 2018, Lenovo and NetApp announced its technology partnership, so Lenovo OEM Netapp products under its own name: Lenovo ThinkSystem DE (using NetApp's EF and E-Series array technology), and ThinkSystem DM uses ONTAP software with Lenovo servers and supports FC-NVMe (analog for NetApp FAS and AFF systems). Vector Data's Vault series of products are rugged and carrier-grade versions of NetApp systems including -48V DC Power and NEBS Level 3 Certification.

== Reception ==
=== Controversy ===
==== Syrian surveillance ====
In November 2011, during the 2011 Syrian uprising, NetApp was named as one of several companies whose products were being used in the Syrian government crackdown. The equipment was allegedly sold to the Syrians by an authorized NetApp reseller.

On April 7, 2014, NetApp was notified by the US Department of Commerce "that it had completed its review of this matter and determined that NetApp had not violated the U.S. export laws", and that the file on the matter had been closed.

==== Legal dispute with Sun Microsystems ====
In September 2007, NetApp started proceedings against Sun Microsystems, claiming that the ZFS File System developed by Sun infringed its patents. The following month, Sun announced plans to countersue based on alleged misuse by NetApp of Sun's own patented technology. Several of NetApp's patent claims were rejected on the basis of prior art after re-examination by the United States Patent and Trademark Office. On September 9, 2010, NetApp announced an agreement with Oracle Corporation (the new owner of Sun Microsystems) to dismiss the suits.

=== Awards ===
NetApp was listed amongst Silicon Valley Top 25 Corporate Philanthropists in 2013. NetApp was Named Brand of the Year by the Think Global Awards in 2019. In 2023, NetApp was named Best Company to Work For by U.S. News & World Report. In 2024, consulting firm Frost & Sullivan named NetApp Global Company of the Year in the hybrid cloud storage management industry.

== Environment ==
In 2021, the CDP Climate Change Score improved to B−. In some NetApp offices, employees have formed Green Teams to integrate sustainable values into their daily lives.

== See also ==
- NetApp FAS
- ONTAP
- Write Anywhere File Layout (WAFL)
- Team NetApp
- Kaleidescape
