= César Cernuda =

President of Microsoft Latin America

- Born: 1971 or 1972 (age 53–54)
- Education: B.S., ESIC University; PDD (Program for Management Development), IESE Business School, University of Navarra
- Occupation: President of NetApp

César Cernuda was president of Microsoft Latin America and corporate vice president of Microsoft and is President of NetApp.

== Career ==
Early in his career, Cernuda worked at Software AG and Banco 21. In 1997, he joined Microsoft Spain. During his career at Microsoft, Cernuda has served as the company's vice president of sales, marketing and services for Latin America. He became president of Microsoft's business in the Asia Pacific region in 2013. In 2014, he received the "100 Españoles" award given to Spaniards who achieve international recognition.

In June 2016, Microsoft appointed Cernuda as a corporate vice president and its president of Latin America, a position in which he oversees 2,500 employees, and 80,000 business partnerships. He is the first person of Spanish heritage to reach the level of corporate vice presidency in the company. Cernuda stated in October 2016 that he has three goals in this role: to make technology more integrated into daily life, to boost productivity in the workplace, and to promote smarter cloud storage. As part of his leadership style, he advocates for flexible work arrangements, and he does not have his own office or desk. In June 2018, ESIC Business & Marketing School awarded him an Aster Award for Best Professional Career.

On July 1, 2020, Cernuda joined NetApp as President.

In July, 2026, Cernuda was appointed Vice President of the Board of Endeavor España, an organisation dedicated to identifying and supporting high-impact entrepreneurs with the potential to build world-leading companies at global scale, of which he had been a board member since 2025.

Cernuda has also served as president of Microsoft Asia Pacific. At Microsoft, he was instrumental in accelerating the company's transformation for the cloud era.

Cernuda serves as an independent director and chair of the ESG Committee for Gestamp. He is vice president of the American Chamber of Commerce in Spain and a member of IESE Business School's International Advisory Board.

== Personal life ==
Cernuda holds a bachelor's degree in business administration and marketing from ESIC University and completed a Management Development Program at the IESE Business School at the University of Navarra in Spain. He has also completed the Leadership for Senior Executives program at the Harvard Business School. He is married and has two children.

Cernuda completed the Leading Sustainable Corporations Programme at Oxford University's Saïd Business School.
